= Fruits & Veggies – More Matters =

American public health campaign

Fruits & Veggies – More Matters is a national public health initiative from Produce for Better Health Foundation and Centers for Disease Control and Prevention (CDC) to increase the consumption of fruits and vegetables. This campaign, begun in 2007, took the place of the 5 A Day program. The shift was implemented in order to better communicate updated dietary guidelines, which recommended more than five servings of fruits and vegetables for some Americans.

== Details ==
The United States Department of Agriculture’s 2005 Dietary Guidelines for Americans, released in January 2005, recommends various numbers of servings of fruits and vegetables depending on an individual’s calorie needs – ranging from 4 to 13 servings, or 2-6.5 cups (~480–1,560 mL), per day. Yet research indicates that over 90 percent of Americans do not meet their recommended amount. To meet these recommendations, most need to more than double the amount of fruits and vegetables they currently eat. Fruits & Veggies—More Matters is designed to encourage Americans to eat more fruits and vegetables for better health.

Produce for Better Health Foundation launched a consumer website in March 2007 aimed at educating Gen X moms about the Fruits & Veggies—More Matters campaign and the benefits of eating more fruits and vegetables. The Fruits & Veggies—More Matters website offers nutrition information, selection and storage advice, recipes, shopping and meal planning advice, tips for increasing produce consumption, and other useful information about fruits and vegetables. Over 300 short informational videos demonstrate how to check different fruits and vegetables for ripeness, outline proper storage methods, present healthy and quick recipes, and offer other information about fruits and vegetables.

The Fruits & Veggies—More Matters campaign stresses that it is easy to eat more fruits and vegetables because all forms (fresh, frozen, canned, dried and 100 percent juice) are nutritious. The Fruits & Veggies—More Matters logo can be found on select packages of fresh, frozen, canned, dried and 100 percent fruit and vegetable juice products in stores.

== History ==
- 1991 - The National Cancer Institute (NCI) and the Produce for Better Health Foundation creates the 5 A Day for Better Health Program.
- October 2005 - CDC becomes lead federal agency and national health authority for the 5 A Day program.
- March 2007 - The 5 A Day program becomes the National Fruit and Vegetable Program. The new campaign is Fruits & Veggies—More Matters.

== See also ==
- Food and Nutrition Service
- Food groups
- Food guide pyramid
- Healthy diet
- History of USDA nutrition guides
- Human nutrition
- MyPlate
- MyPyramid
- Nutrition Education
