= List of nutrition guides =

This is a list of nutrition guides. A nutrition guide is a reference that provides nutrition advice for general health, typically by dividing foods into food groups and recommending servings of each group. Nutrition guides can be presented in written or visual form, and are commonly published by government agencies, health associations and university health departments.

Some countries also have nutrition facts labels which are not listed here; many of those reference specific target amounts for various nutrients.

== Historical guides ==
=== Ancient Greece ===
The Hippocratic Corpus of Ancient Greece contains one of the earliest known nutrition guides. It recommends a seasonal diet. For winter, it advises eating a heavy diet of bread and roasted meat and fish, while avoiding vegetables and restricting liquids to, if anything, strong wine. It then recommends a lighter summer diet of soft barley cake, vegetables, boiled meat, and large quantities of diluted wine. Gradual transitions between these two diets are advised in the intervening months.

=== Imperial China ===
During the Tang dynasty, Chinese physician Sun Simiao is believed to have written the first nutrition guide in traditional Chinese medicine. In his book, Precious Prescriptions for Emergencies (Chinese: 備急千金要方; pinyin: Beiji qianjin yaofang), the chapter "Dietary Treatment" (Chinese: 食治; pinyin: Shiji) contains sections describing the effects of eating fruits, vegetables, grains and animals.

=== First food pyramid ===
Amid high food prices in 1972, Sweden's National Board of Health and Welfare developed the idea of "basic foods" that were both cheap and nutritious, and "supplemental foods" that added nutrition missing from the basic foods. KF, a consumer co-op that worked with the Board, sought to illustrate these food groups. KF developed a food pyramid because it could depict basic foods as its base, and introduced the guide to the public in 1974 in their magazine, Vi. At the base were bread, cereals, potatoes, milk, cheese and margarine; above it was a large section of supplemental vegetables and fruit; and at the top was an apex of supplemental meat, fish and eggs. The pyramid competed with the National Board's "dietary circle," which KF saw as problematic for resembling a cake divided into seven slices, and for not indicating how much of each food should be eaten. While the Board distanced itself from the pyramid, KF continued to promote it, and food pyramids were developed in other Scandinavian countries, plus West Germany, Japan and Sri Lanka. The United States later developed its first food pyramid in 1992.

Today, both the Swedish government and KF have moved to the Plate Model.

== Government guides ==
=== Australia ===
The Australian Department of Health and Aged Care publishes The Australian Guide to Healthy Eating, which features a wheel divided into five sections: approximately 40 percent bread, cereals, rice, pasta and noodles; 30 percent vegetables and legumes; 10 percent fruit; 10 percent milk, yogurt and cheese; and 10 percent lean meat, fish, poultry, eggs, nuts and legumes. Below the wheel are reminders to drink plenty of water and eat fats and sweets occasionally or in small amounts. More specific recommendations are provided based on age, gender, life stage and activity level.

=== Austria ===
The Austrian Federal Ministry of Health uses The Austrian Food Pyramid (German: Die Österreichische Ernährungspyramide), which is divided into 25 blocks, each block representing a daily serving from a food group. Starting at the base, there are six servings of non-alcoholic beverages (preferably low-energy drinks like water, tea, unsweetened fruit juice and vegetable juice); three servings of vegetables and legumes; two of fruit; four of cereals, bread, pasta, rice and potatoes (preferably whole grains); three of milk and dairy (two "white," like milk, yogurt or cream cheese, and one of yellow cheese); one of fats and oil (preferably olive or canola oil); three of meat, fish, sausage and eggs (preferably fish or lean meat); and three of fatty, sweet and salty foods (though not nutritionally recommended and to be consumed rarely).

=== Belgium ===
The Voedingsdriehoek is a (mostly in Flanders) widely used tool for dietitians, health educators, schools, etc. to explain a balanced diet. The triangle is constructed as a pyramid with five different layers. The bottom layer is the largest in area, and so the most important; the top is narrow and represents small amounts of food, although it is an essential ingredient. The layers are (from top to bottom): Oil / fats; Protein: meat, fish, eggs, dairy products, meat substitutes; Fruits and vegetables; Starch or carbohydrates (bread, potatoes, rice, pasta, etc.); Drinks. In 2005 a (rather symbolic) layer was added at the bottom: sports and exercise. This is not a food, but an important part of a healthy diet and lifestyle. The information services use the "active" food pyramid.

=== Brazil ===
Brazil's Ministry of Health publishes the Food Guide (Portuguese: Guia Alimentar), which features a map of Brazil depicting each of Brazil's five regions as puzzle pieces representing a food group. However, Brazil's food recommendations differ from the map, and feature eight food groups: rice, bread, pasta, potato and cassavas (5 servings a day); vegetables and legumes (3 servings); fruits (3); milk, cheese and yogurt (3); beans (1); meat, fish and eggs (1); oils and fats (1); and sugars and sweets (no more than one).

=== Canada ===
Canada's Food Guide from Health Canada was updated and released in January 2019. It promotes eating a variety of healthy foods each day and filling half your plate with vegetables and fruits, and the other half with protein foods and whole grain foods. It promotes making water your drink of choice and encourages healthy eating habits such as cooking more often and enjoying meals with others. The 2019 Guide no longer classifies food into the four food groups from previous versions and it does away with recommended servings. The previous version had four food groups: vegetables and fruit (7 to 10 servings a day for adults, depending on biological sex), grain products (6 to 8), milk and alternatives (2), and meat and alternatives (2 to 3).

Canada developed its first nutrition guide in 1942 as part of its wartime nutrition program.

=== China ===
China's Ministry of Health uses the Balanced Diet Pagoda (Chinese: 平衡膳食宝塔), which is divided into five stories ascending from largest to smallest. Cereals are at the large base; topped by vegetables and fruits; then fish, poultry, meat, eggs and other animal foods; followed by milk and soy foods; and topped with fats and oils in the small spire. Beside the pagoda are images representing water and exercise.

=== Denmark ===
Denmark's Food Administration uses the Diet Compass (Danish: Kostkompasset) to depict its "Dietary 8" (Danish: 8 kostråd) guidelines, with an image on each compass point representing a guideline. Those guidelines are: "Eat 6 fruits and vegetables a day," "Eat fish and seafood several times a week," "Eat potatoes, rice or pasta and whole wheat bread every day," "Cut back on sugar," "Cut back on greasy foods," "Eat a varied diet and maintain a normal weight," "Quench your thirst with water," and, "Be physically active at least 30 minutes a day."

=== France ===
France's National Institute for Prevention and Health Education has 25 separate food guides under the title The Food Guide For All (French: Le Guide Alimentaire Pour Tous). Each guide is based on a consumer's personality, habits and lifestyle. There are guides for people who: are health-conscious, do not care about food, prepare family meals, are poor, eat at restaurants, skip meals, do not cook, have large appetites, are on diets, prefer certain foods, avoid various foods (including meat), are sedentary, are athletic, and more. Each guide features a "portrait" in the image of a happy face designed out of foods representing that consumer's type. The portraits are billed as nutrition recommendations, though they are more decorative than informative.

=== Germany ===
Germany's state-funded Aid Information Service uses the Food Pyramid (German: Ernährungspyramide), which divides a pyramid into 22 blocks, each block representing a hand-sized serving from a food group. Starting at the base, there are six blocks for beverages, three for vegetables, two for fruit, four for grains, three for dairy, one for meat and fish, one for oils, one for fats, and one for sweets and alcohol. Beverages, vegetables, fruit and grains are marked green for "free travel"; meat and dairy are marked yellow for "caution"; and oils, fats, sweets and alcohol are marked red for "brake lights". Aid also collaborated with the German Nutrition Society to create a 3D pyramid model.

=== India ===
India's National Institute of Nutrition publishes the Dietary Guidelines for Indians, which, among other diagrams, includes the Food Pyramid. The pyramid has a base of beans and legumes to eat adequately, a second layer of vegetables and fruit to eat liberally, a third layer of meat, fish, eggs and oils to eat moderately, and an apex of fatty, salty and sugary foods to eat sparingly. Accompanying the pyramid is a recommendation of regular exercise and physical activity, as well as warnings against drinking alcohol and smoking.

=== Ireland ===
The island of Ireland's Food Safety Promotion Board uses The Food Pyramid, which is divided into five levels: bread, cereals and potatoes at the large base (6 or more servings); then fruit and vegetables (5); followed by milk, cheese and yogurt (3); then meat, fish, eggs and alternatives (2); and finally fats, high fat/sugar snacks, foods and drinks at the apex (small amounts). At least 8 cups of water a day are also recommended.

=== Israel ===
The Food Pyramid (Hebrew: פירמידת המזון) from Israel's Ministry of Health is divided into six levels. At the wide base is water; followed by starches, including pasta, bread, corn and yams; then fruits and vegetables; then meat, fish, eggs and dairy; then fats and oils; and finally sugary foods at the small apex. Images around the pyramid represent exercise.

=== Italy ===
The Italian Ministry of Health uses the Italian Food Pyramid (Italian: Piramide Alimentare Italiana), which is divided into squares, triangles, trapezoids and rectangles that represent one, one-half, one-and-a-half, and two servings, respectively. Beginning from the base, the divisions are: fruit (2 servings), water (1), vegetables (2), bread (1.5), biscotti (0.5), potatoes (0.5), rice and pasta (1.5), meat (1), eggs (0.5), fish (0.5), legumes (0.5), cold cut meats (0.5), milk (0.5), dairy (0.5), oils and fats (1), sweets (0.5) and wine or beer (0.5). Along the edges of the pyramid are triangles representing physical activity. The pyramid is intended to represent the variety of foods eaten over an entire week, averaged into daily portions. Also provided is an alternative, more traditional pyramid for a single day, divided into six layers representing six food groups; as well as two additional pyramids for children.

=== Japan ===
The Food Guide (Japanese: 食事バランスガイド), from Japan's Health and Agriculture ministries, is depicted as a spinning top with a wide upper layer tapering to a narrow bottom. At the large upper level is a staple meal of carbohydrates, including rice, bread and noodles (5 to 7 servings a day); followed below by a side dish of vegetables, potatoes, beans (except soybeans), mushrooms and seaweed (5 to 6); then a smaller main course of protein, including meat, fish, eggs and soy (3 to 5); and finally the narrow point, divided between dairy (2) and fruit (2). The top's handle is filled with "essential" water and tea, and running in circles around the handle is a figure representing moderate exercise. A small motion line beside the top represents sweet beverages in moderation.

=== Mexico ===
Mexico's Department of Nutrition and Health Promotion uses The Plate of Good Eating (Spanish: El Plato del Bien Comer), which is divided into thirds: vegetables and fruits (in equal proportion); cereals; and legumes and animal products. The guide further recommends eating "many" vegetables and fruits and "enough" cereals. The legume and animal products section is subdivided, and "few" animal products are recommended, while the guide recommends combining the larger legume section with cereals. Additional recommendations are to include each of the three food groups in each of the three main meals of the day, to eat the greatest possible variety of food, to eat according to individual needs and conditions, and to eat the least possible fats, oils, sugar and salt.

=== Netherlands ===
The Netherlands Nutrition Center uses the Wheel of Five (Dutch: De Schijf van Vijf), which is divided into five groups: approximately 30 percent vegetables and fruit; 30 percent bread, cereals, potatoes, rice, pasta, couscous, and legumes; 16 percent dairy, meat, fish, eggs and meat substitutes; 16 percent beverages; and 8 percent fats and oils. More specific recommendations are provided based on age and gender.

=== South Korea ===
South Korea's Korean Nutrition Society uses the Food Bicycle (Korean: 식품구성 자전거), with a small front wheel filled with water and a large rear wheel composed of approximately one-third grains; 20 percent meat, fish, eggs and beans; 20 percent vegetables; 12 percent fruits; 12 percent dairy; and 3 percent oils and sugars. A person is pedaling the bicycle, representing exercise. More specific recommendations are provided based on age, gender and life stage.

Before 2010, South Korea used a food pagoda model very similar to China's current guide.

=== Spain ===
Spain's Ministry of Health, Social Policy and Equality uses the NAOS Pyramid (Spanish: Pirámide NAOS), which promotes a Mediterranean diet as well as plenty of physical activity, and is drawn as a sailboat on water. It is divided into beverages and water at the base; an equal division between physical activity and a combination of grains, vegetables, tubers, fruit, olive oil and dairy in the second level, which is labeled "several times a day" and color-coded green; an equal division between sports and a combination of meat, fish, eggs, legumes and nuts in the third level, which is labeled "several times a week" and is color-coded orange; and an apex of saturated fats, sugars, salt, and sedentary activity labeled "occasionally" and color-coded red.

=== Sweden ===
Sweden's Food Agency uses the Plate Model (Swedish: tallriksmodellen), which divides a plate into approximately 40 percent potatoes, rice, pasta and bread; 40 percent vegetables and fruit; and 20 percent meat, fish, eggs and legumes. People requiring more energy are allowed a larger share of carbohydrates, while people who are overweight can make up to half their plate vegetables and fruit.

Previously, Sweden used the Dietary Circle created in 1963, while Swedish consumer cooperative KF created the world's first food pyramid in 1974.

=== Switzerland ===
Switzerland's Federal Office of Public Health uses the Food Pyramid (German: Lebensmittelpyramide) developed by the Swiss Society for Nutrition. At the base is 1 to 2 liters of liquids, preferably non-sugared beverages; then three servings of vegetables and two servings of fruit of different colors; followed by whole grains, beans, cereals and potatoes to be eaten with each meal; then three servings of milk or dairy; one serving of meat, fish, eggs, cheese or another protein; oils, fats and nuts daily in moderation; and an apex of sweet/salty snacks and sweetened/alcoholic drinks in moderation for pleasure.

=== Slovenia ===
Slovenia's earlier food-based dietary guidance was known as 12 Steps to Healthy Eating (Slovene: 12 korakov do zdravega prehranjevanja). It was first published in 2000 and revised in 2011; the national food guide pyramid was first published in 2000 and revised in 2015, and the Healthy Plate was introduced in 2007. The National Institute of Public Health summary presents the 12 steps as brief advice to choose a varied diet with more plant than animal foods, choose whole grains, eat vegetables and fruit several times a day, limit fat, salt, sugar and alcohol, drink water, handle food hygienically, and be physically active.

In 2026, the Slovenian Nutrition Guidelines 2025 (SNG2025; Slovene: Slovenske smernice za prehrano 2025) were made available online as a detailed scientific evidence base, described as a 267-page document with 1048 references. The guidelines set quantitative targets for food groups and promote a plant-forward dietary pattern aligned with the EAT–Lancet planetary health diet, emphasizing vegetables, fruits, legumes, whole grains, nuts, seeds and unsaturated oils, while keeping red and processed meat, free sugars, refined grains, saturated fat, salt, ultra-processed foods and alcohol to a minimum.

The development process of the new Slovenian guidelines was described in the scientific literature as broad and transparent. According to a 2024 process paper, it involved a core working group of ten multidisciplinary experts appointed by the Ministry of Health, a 33-member extended Slovenian working group, six international reviewers, World Health Organization-supported expert workshops, external peer review, public consultation, and planned implementation and evaluation phases. An earlier narrative review described the activities of the Slovenian Strategic Council for Nutrition that preceded this work.

A 2026 comparison paper reported that the SNG2025 differed from prior Slovenian guidance by providing quantified targets for more than 16 food groups, whereas previous Slovenian food-based dietary guidelines were mainly qualitative. A later international comparison found the SNG2025 broadly aligned with contemporary national and international food-based dietary guidelines.

=== Turkey ===
Turkey's Ministry of Health uses the Basic Food Groups (Turkish: Temel Besin Grupları), a four-part division of milk and dairy; meat, eggs, fish, legumes and seeds; vegetables and fruit; and bread and cereal. Each food group is accompanied by bullet points, such as serving recommendations or advice to eat more raw vegetables and whole grains.

=== United Kingdom ===
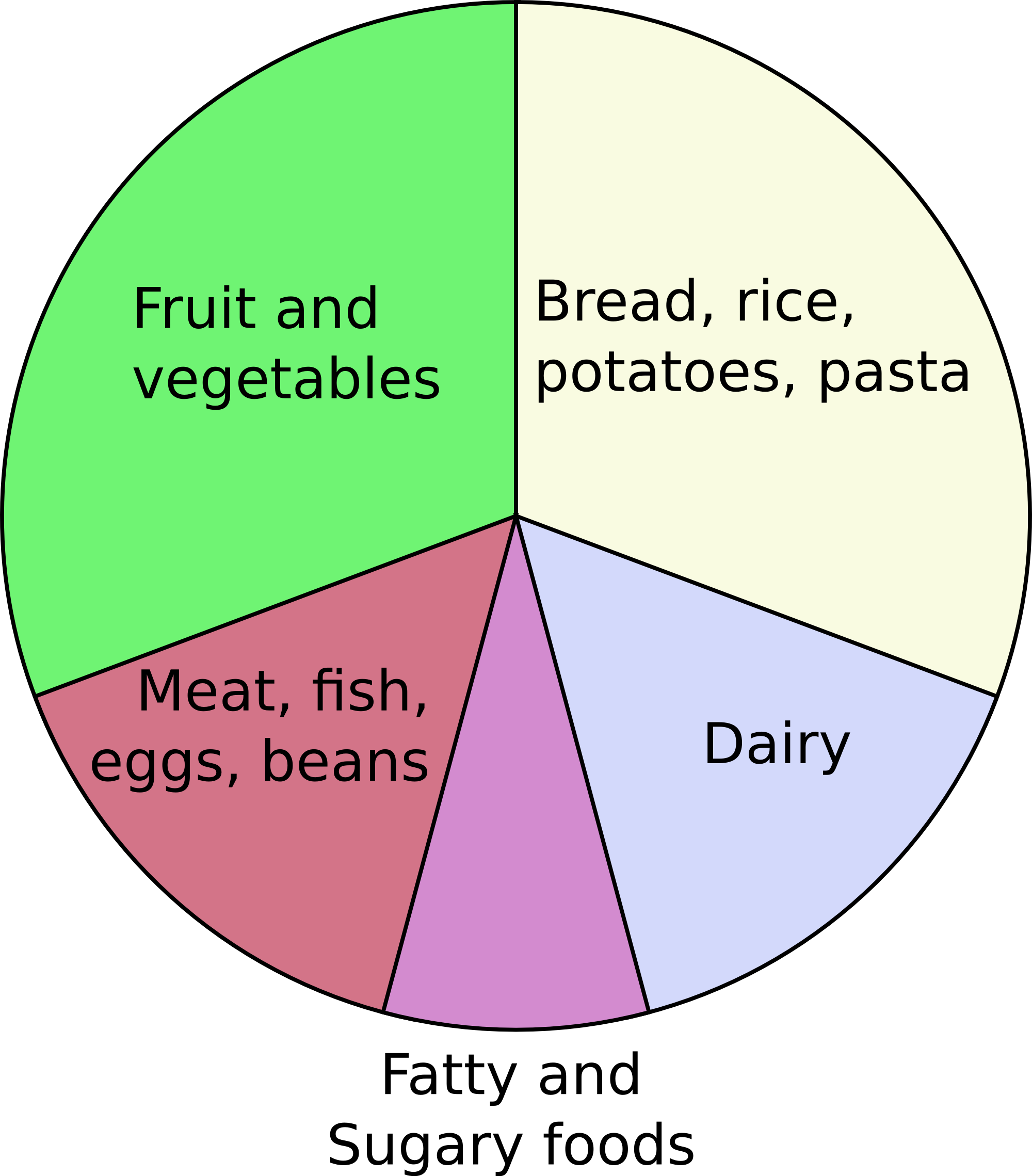
The Eatwell plate, as described by the United Kingdom's NHS and FSA

The United Kingdom's Department of Health published Dietary Reference Values. These are equivalent to the easier to understand Eatwell plate used by the National Health Service. This consists of roughly one-third fruit and vegetables ("at least 5 portions"); one-third bread, rice, potatoes and pasta ("plenty"); a smaller amount of milk and dairy ("some"); meat, fish, eggs and beans in the same proportion as dairy ("some"); and a small wedge of fatty and sugary foods.

=== United States ===
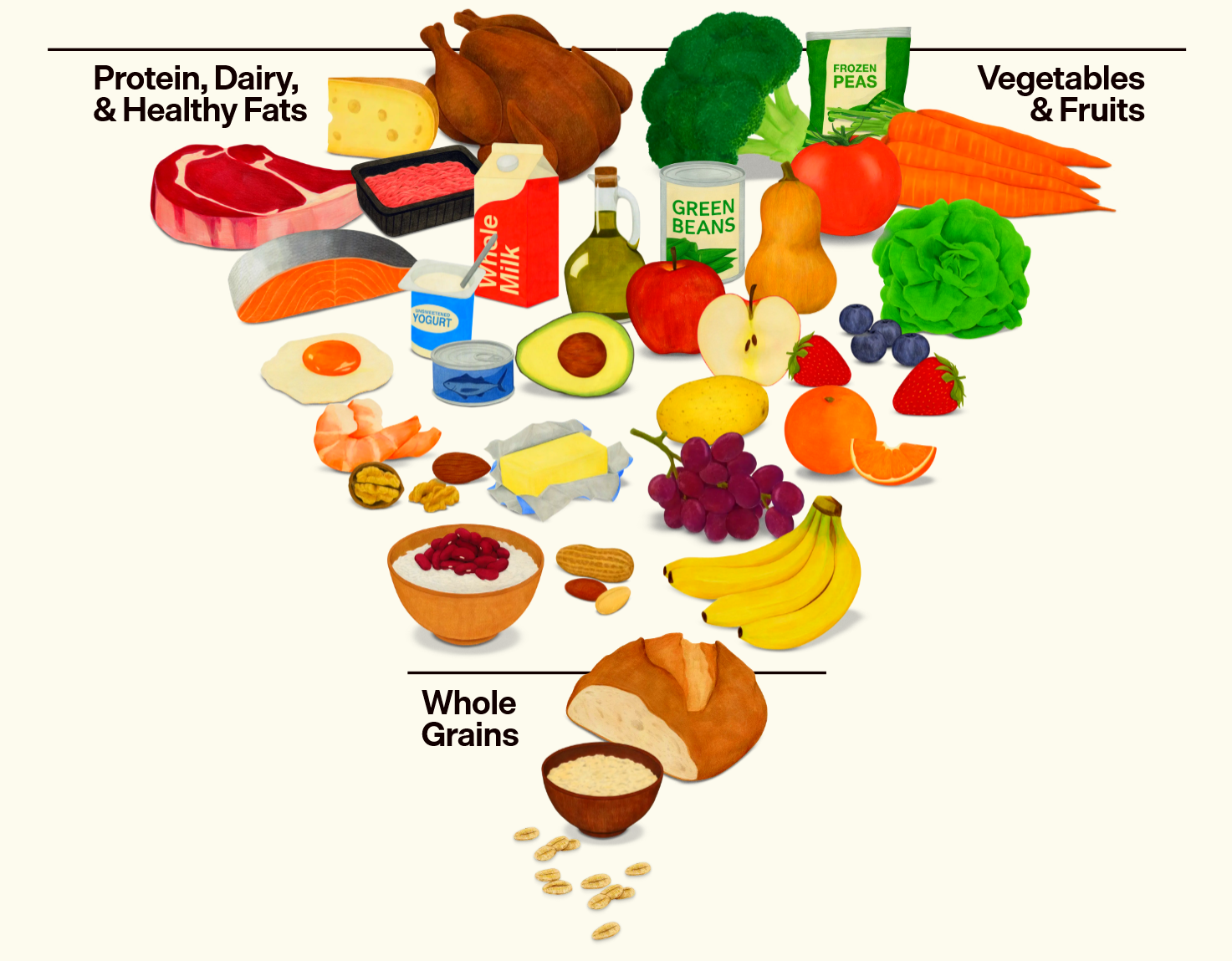
"The New Pyramid", endorsed by the Department of Agriculture

MyPlate

In the United States, the Department of Agriculture uses "The New Pyramid", an inverted food pyramid that prioritizes non-processed foods over processed items. The pyramid places proteins, vegetables and full-fat dairy at the top, while avoiding foods that are highly processed. This approach claims to reduce chronic diseases such as obesity, diabetes, and fatty liver disease.

Previous USDA food guides include the Basic 7 (1943–1956), the Basic Four (1956–1992), the Food Guide Pyramid (1992–2005), MyPyramid (2005–2011), and MyPlate (2011–2026), the last of which is still used in nutrition education.

The National Institutes of Health uses the Dietary Approaches to Stop Hypertension (DASH) Eating Plan for people seeking to lower their blood pressure. DASH differs from MyPlate in that the protein category is replaced by a smaller proportion of lean meats, poultry, and fish; there are separate sections for fats and oils, legumes, and sweets; and fruits and vegetables do not constitute half of the diet.

The Center for Nutrition Policy and Promotion in the USDA and the United States Department of Health and Human Services jointly release a longer textual document called Dietary Guidelines for Americans, updated in 2026 with the next scheduled revision in 2030.

Dietary Reference Intake values are published by the Institute of Medicine for general use, but nutrition facts labels in the U.S. use the older Reference Daily Intake standards instead.

=== World Health Organization ===
The World Health Organization uses The 3 Fives, a guide featuring five key points in each of three categories. The three categories are safer food, a healthy diet, and appropriate physical activity. In the healthy diet category, the five keys are: "Give your baby only breast milk for the first 6 months of life," "Eat a variety of food," "Eat plenty of vegetables and fruit," "Eat moderate amounts of fats and oil," and "Eat less salt and sugar." Each key includes bullet points with further recommendations. The 3 Fives was originally developed for distribution at major sporting events like the Olympics and the World Cup, but it can also be used for general audiences.

Before The 3 Fives, the WHO used the CINDI dietary guide, which included the CINDI pyramid. The guide was intended to help European health professionals and policymakers develop their own national nutrition guides. The pyramid has a large green base representing approximately two-thirds of the triangle's area, which is filled with vegetables, fruits, grains and starches. A middle layer shaded orange for "caution" is divided into two equal sections: low-fat milk and dairy; and beans, lentils, legumes, fish, eggs, poultry and lean meat. At the top is a small "red zone" of fats and sweets.

=== Food and Agriculture Organization (FAO) ===
FAO provides technical assistance to countries for developing, revising and implementing food-based dietary guidelines and food guides in line with current scientific evidence. FAO also carries out periodic reviews on progress made in the development and use of dietary guidelines. FAO's food based dietary guidelines website collects more than 80 national guidelines.

== Other guides ==
- The American Diabetes Association uses the Create Your Plate system, which divides a plate into three sections: non-starchy vegetables (the largest section), starchy foods, and meat or meat substitutes. Like MyPlate, the ADA complements its plate with a glass of low-fat or nonfat milk.
- The German Nutrition Society (German: Deutsche Gesellschaft für Ernährung) publishes the Food Circle (German: Ernährungskreis), which is divided into 30 percent cereals and potatoes; 26 percent vegetables and salad; 17 percent fruit; 18 percent milk and dairy; 7 percent meat, sausage, fish and eggs; and 2 percent fats and oils. Beverages, represented by a glass of water, are placed in the interior of the circle.
- The Harvard School of Public Health uses the Healthy Eating Pyramid, which is split into nine sections, including a base of daily exercise and weight control. Compared to MyPlate, grains become whole grains, with refined grains in a "use sparingly" category; protein is split between "fish, poultry and eggs" and "nuts, seeds, beans and tofu" with red meat and processed meat in a "use sparingly" category; healthy fats and oils have their own section; and dairy can be substituted with calcium and vitamin D supplements. To the side of the pyramid are alcohol in moderation and a daily multivitamin.
- The Massachusetts Department of Health and Human Services uses the Plate Method, which shows a plate that is one-half fruits and vegetables, one-quarter grains and starches, and one-quarter meat and protein.
- Overall nutritional quality index
- The Physicians Committee for Responsible Medicine uses the Power Plate, which promotes a vegan diet and is divided into equal parts fruit, grains, legumes and vegetables.
- The University of Michigan Health System uses the Healing Foods Pyramid, which consists of 11 sections, including a base of water. Compared to MyPlate, it adds sections for legumes, seasonings, healthy fats, and eggs. Lean meats are in a weekly category, as are fish and seafood. An optional category includes alcohol, tea and dark chocolate.
- The LiveWell for LIFE project uses National Plates to show the ideal composition of diets in various EU countries that are both healthy, environmentally sustainable and affordable. This concept was pioneered by WWF in the UK and is now financially supported by the European Commission under the LIFE Plus programme (see Sustainable diet).

== See also ==
- Glycemic index
- Insulin index
- Satiety value
