= History of USDA nutrition guidelines =

The history of USDA nutrition guidelines includes over 100 years of nutrition advice promulgated by the USDA (United States Department of Agriculture). The guidelines have been updated over time, to adopt new scientific findings and new public health marketing techniques. The current guidelines are the Dietary Guidelines for Americans 2025–2030. The 2015–2020 guidelines were criticized as not accurately representing scientific information about optimal nutrition, and as being overly influenced by the agricultural industries the USDA promotes. Over time, the guidelines evolved from early food groups recommendations to visual guides such as the Food Pyramid and MyPlate. More recent updates to the guidelines have also led to debate about recommendations for sugar and alcohol consumption.

== Earliest guides ==
The USDA's first nutrition guidelines were published in 1894 by Dr. Wilbur Olin Atwater as a farmers' bulletin. In Atwater's 1904 publication titled Principles of Nutrition and Nutritive Value of Food, he advocated variety, proportionality and moderation; measuring calories; and an efficient, affordable diet that focused on nutrient-rich foods and less fat, sugar and starch. This information preceded the discovery of individual vitamins beginning in 1910.

A new guide in 1916, Food for Young Children by nutritionist Caroline Hunt, categorized foods into milk and meat; cereals; vegetables and fruits; fats and fatty foods; and sugars and sugary foods. How to Select Food in 1917 promoted these five food groups to adults, and the guidelines remained in place through the 1920s. In 1933, the USDA introduced food plans at four different cost levels in response to the Great Depression.

In 1941, the first Recommended Dietary Allowances were created, listing specific intakes for calories, protein, iron, calcium, and vitamins A, B_{1}, B_{2}, B_{3}, C and D.

== Basic 7 ==
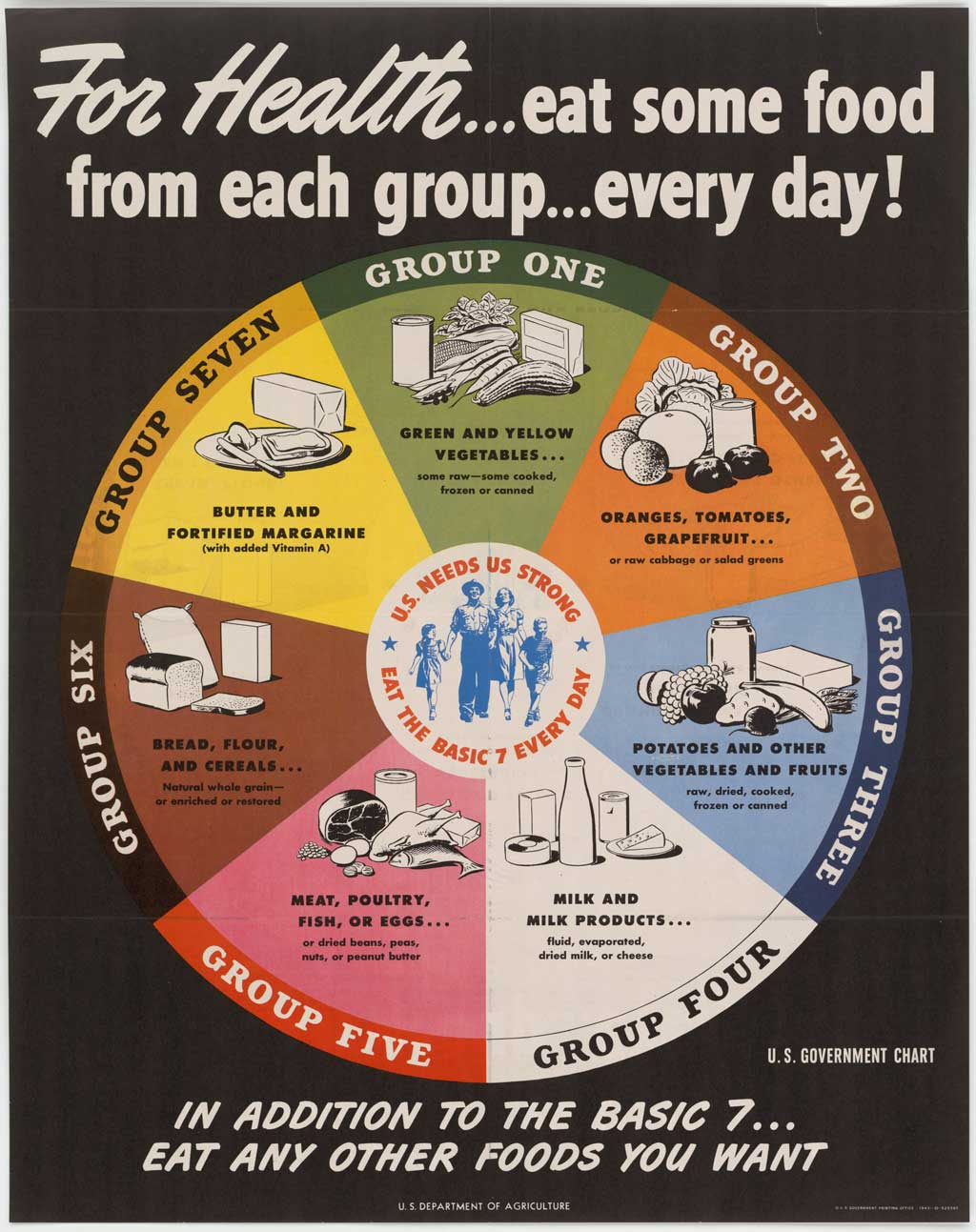
The USDA's "Basic 7" food groups from 1943 to 1956

In 1943, during World War II, the USDA introduced a nutrition guide promoting the "Basic 7" food groups to help maintain nutritional standards under wartime food rationing. The Basic 7 food groups were:

1. Green and yellow vegetables (some raw; some cooked, frozen or canned)
2. Oranges, tomatoes, grapefruit (or raw cabbage or salad greens)
3. Potatoes and other vegetables and fruits (raw, dried, cooked, frozen or canned)
4. Milk and milk products (fluid, evaporated, dried milk, or cheese)
5. Meat, poultry, fish, or eggs (or dried beans, peas, nuts, or peanut butter)
6. Bread, flour, and cereals (natural whole grain, or enriched or restored)
7. Butter and fortified margarine (with added Vitamin A)

== Basic Four ==
From 1956 until 1992 the United States Department of Agriculture recommended its "Basic Four" food groups. These food groups were:

- milk
- meat
- fruit and vegetables
- bread and cereals

"Other foods" were said to round out meals and satisfy appetites. These included additional servings from the Basic Four, or foods such as butter, margarine, salad dressing and cooking oil, sauces, jellies and syrups.

The Basic Four guide was omnipresent in nutrition education in the United States. A notable example is the 1972 series Mulligan Stew, providing nutrition education for schoolchildren in reruns until 1981.

== Food Guide Pyramid ==
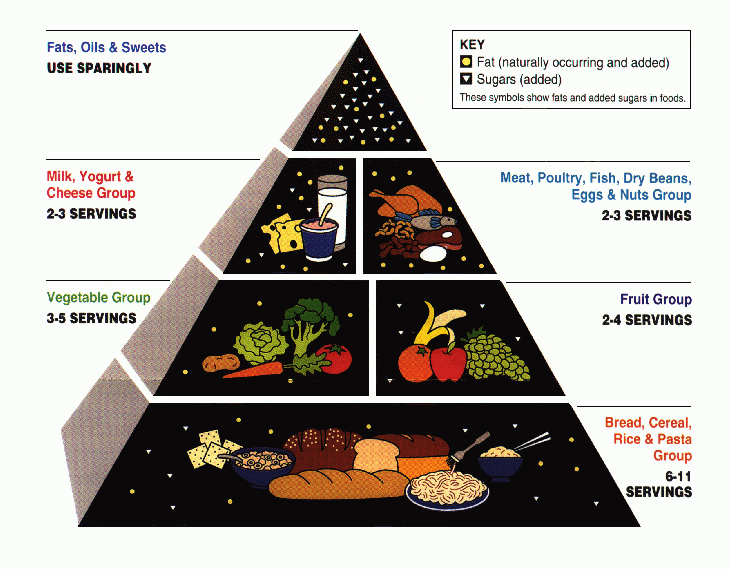
The USDA's 1992 food guide pyramid

The introduction of the USDA's food guide pyramid in 1992 attempted to express the recommended servings of each food group, which previous guides did not do. 6 to 11 servings of bread, cereal, rice and pasta occupied the large base of the pyramid; followed by 3 to 5 servings of vegetables; then fruits (2 to 4); then milk, yogurt and cheese (2 to 3); followed by meat, poultry, fish, dry beans, eggs, and nuts (2 to 3); and finally fats, oils and sweets in the small apex (to be used sparingly). Inside each group were several images of representative foods, as well as symbols representing the fat and sugar contents of the foods.

A modified food pyramid was proposed for adults aged over 70. This "Modified Food Pyramid for 70+ Adults" accounted for changing diets with age by emphasizing water consumption as well as nutrient-dense and high-fiber foods.

== MyPyramid ==
MyPyramid, the revised USDA food pyramid

In 2005, the USDA updated its guide with MyPyramid, which replaced the hierarchical levels of the Food Guide Pyramid with colorful vertical wedges, often displayed without images of foods, creating a more abstract design. Stairs were added up the left side of the pyramid with an image of a climber to represent a push for exercise. The share of the pyramid allotted to grains now only narrowly edged out vegetables and milk, which were of equal proportions. Fruits were next in size, followed by a narrower wedge for protein and a small sliver for oils. An unmarked white tip represented discretionary calories for items such as candy, alcohol, or additional food from any other group.

== MyPlate ==
The MyPlate nutrition guide

From 2011 to 2026, MyPlate was the nutrition guide published by the United States Department of Agriculture, consisting of a diagram of a plate and glass divided into five food groups. It replaced the USDA's MyPyramid diagram on June 2, 2011, ending 19 years of food pyramid iconography. The diagram shows a plate divided into four wedges, with the two slightly larger ones representing vegetables and grains and the two slightly smaller ones representing protein and fruits, and with a circle adjacent to represent dairy (e.g. a glass of milk). The guide is displayed on food packaging and used in nutritional education in the United States. The shift to MyPlate was intended to simplify nutrition guidance and provide a clearer visual representation of a balanced meal for the public. The introduction of MyPlate reflected broader efforts to simplify federal nutrition guidance for the public.

== Eat Real Food ==
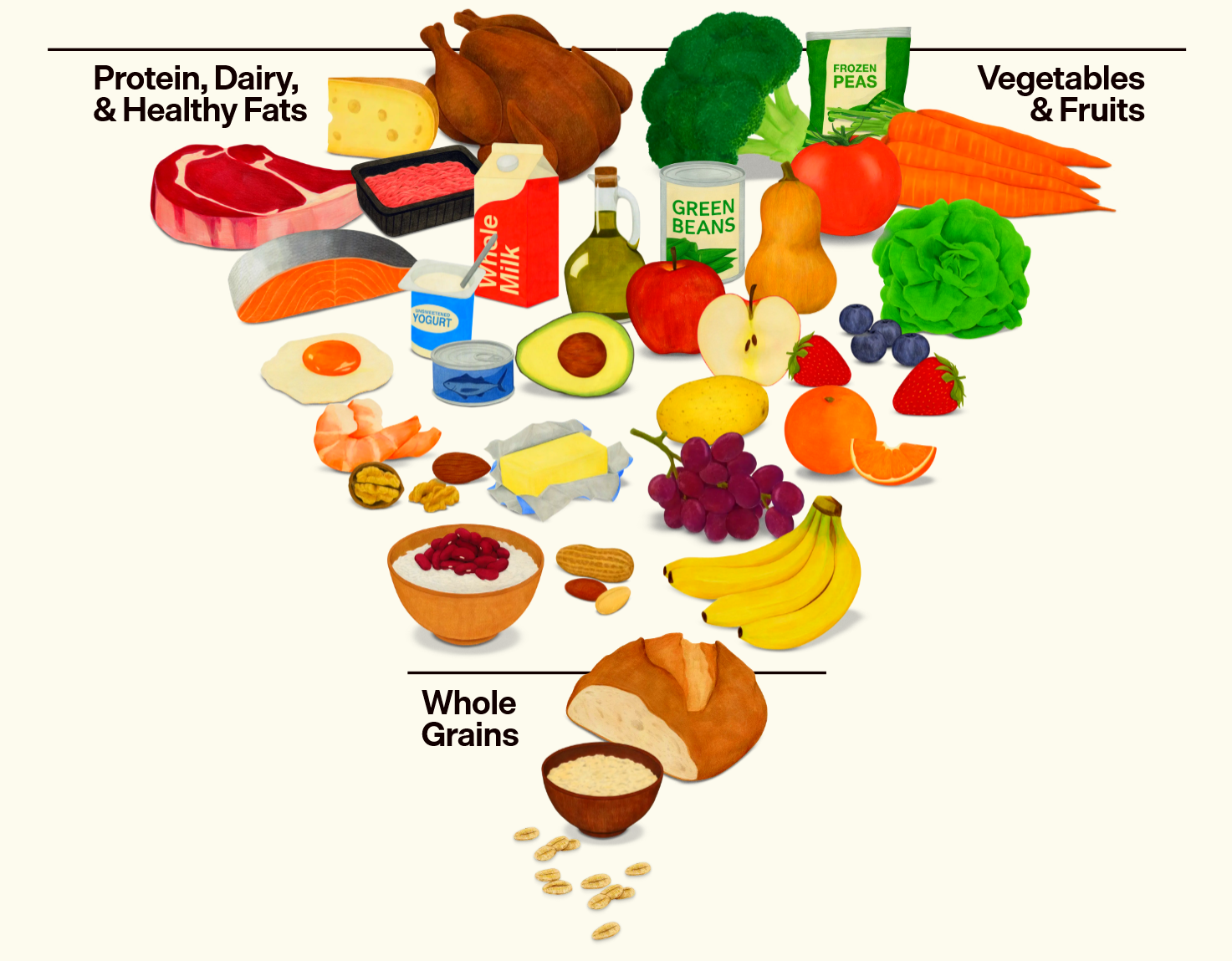
The New Pyramid endorsed by the "Eat Real Food" Campaign (2026)

In January 2026, the USDA published the New Pyramid, an inverted food pyramid that prioritizes non-processed foods over processed items. The pyramid places proteins, vegetables and full-fat dairy at the top, while avoiding foods that are highly processed. This approach claims to reduce chronic diseases such as obesity, diabetes, and fatty liver disease.

== Dietary Guidelines ==
The Center for Nutrition Policy and Promotion in the USDA and the United States Department of Health and Human Services jointly release a longer textual document called Dietary Guidelines for Americans. The first edition was published in 1980, and since 1985 has been updated every five years by the Dietary Guidelines Advisory Committee. Like the USDA Food Pyramid, these guidelines have been criticized as being overly influenced by the agriculture industry. These criticisms of the Dietary Guidelines arose due to the omission of high-quality evidence that the Public Health Service decided to exclude. The phrasing of recommendations was extremely important and widely affected everyone who read it. The wording had to be changed constantly as there were protests due to comments such as "cut down on fatty meats", which led to the U.S Department of Agriculture having to stop the publication of the USDA Food Book. Slight alterations of various dietary guidelines had to be made throughout the 1970s and 1980s in an attempt to calm down the protests emerged. As a compromise, the phrase was changed to "choose lean meat" but did not result in a better situation. In 2015 the committee factored in environmental sustainability for the first time in its recommendations. The committee's 2015 report found that a healthy diet should comprise higher plant based foods and lower animal based foods. It also found that a plant food based diet was better for the environment than one based on meat and dairy.

In 2013 and again in 2015, Edward Archer and colleagues published a series of research articles in PlosOne and Mayo Clinic Proceedings demonstrating that the dietary data used to develop the US Dietary Guidelines were physiologically implausible (i.e., incompatible with survival) and therefore these data were "inadmissible" as scientific evidence and should not be used to inform public policy.

The 2020–2025 guidelines were to be released in spring 2020.

== Criticism and controversy ==
=== Overview of controversies ===
The USDA's Food Pyramid has been a focal point of contention, significantly highlighted in April 1991 when the publication of the "Eating Right Pyramid" was halted. This interruption came as a result of objections from meat and dairy lobbying groups displeased with the guide’s portrayal of their products. Although the USDA cited a need for further research and testing, it wasn't until a year later, backed by additional research, that the Eating Right Pyramid saw the light of day. Even then, adjustments were made to the guide’s graphic design to address industry concerns. This episode serves as a prime example of numerous instances where the food industry endeavored to modify federal dietary recommendations to suit their economic interests.

=== Industry influence ===
The extent of industry influence over the years is well documented. The lobbying from meat and dairy industries has had a pronounced impact on the formulation and representation of the Food Pyramid. Instances where the design or content of the Food Pyramid was tweaked to assuage industry concerns are discussed in Marion Nestle's "Food Politics". The alteration of federal dietary guidelines to cater to industry interests highlights a long-standing issue of industry influence over public health recommendations.

=== Impact on public perception ===
These controversies and the ensuing adjustments to the Food Pyramid have arguably cast a shadow on the public’s trust in USDA dietary guidelines. The ambiguity in the recommended quantities for different food types in the old pyramid also garnered criticism for lack of clarity. The transition from the Food Pyramid to MyPlate in 2011 could be seen as an attempt to mitigate these concerns and realign federal dietary guidelines with current nutritional science, although criticisms persist.

=== Evolving guidelines ===
The controversies surrounding the Food Pyramid prompted the creation of alternative pyramids, like the Vegetarian Diet Pyramid. The successor to the Food Pyramid, MyPlate, also faced its share of criticisms, albeit it hasn't reached the same level of public recognition as the Food Pyramid, with a significant number of Americans unaware of the MyPlate dietary guide.

=== Recent Debates ===
Recent updates to the Dietary Guidelines for Americans have led to debate, particularly around recommendations for sugar and alcohol consumption. The Dietary guidelines for Americans are updated every five years by the U.S. Departments of Agriculture and Health Human Services. Some experts have suggested stricter limits, while others supported maintaining the existing recommendations.

== See also ==
- List of nutrition guides
- 5 A Day
- Fruits & Veggies – More Matters
- Nutrition facts label
