= 5 A Day =

Idea relating to human nutrition

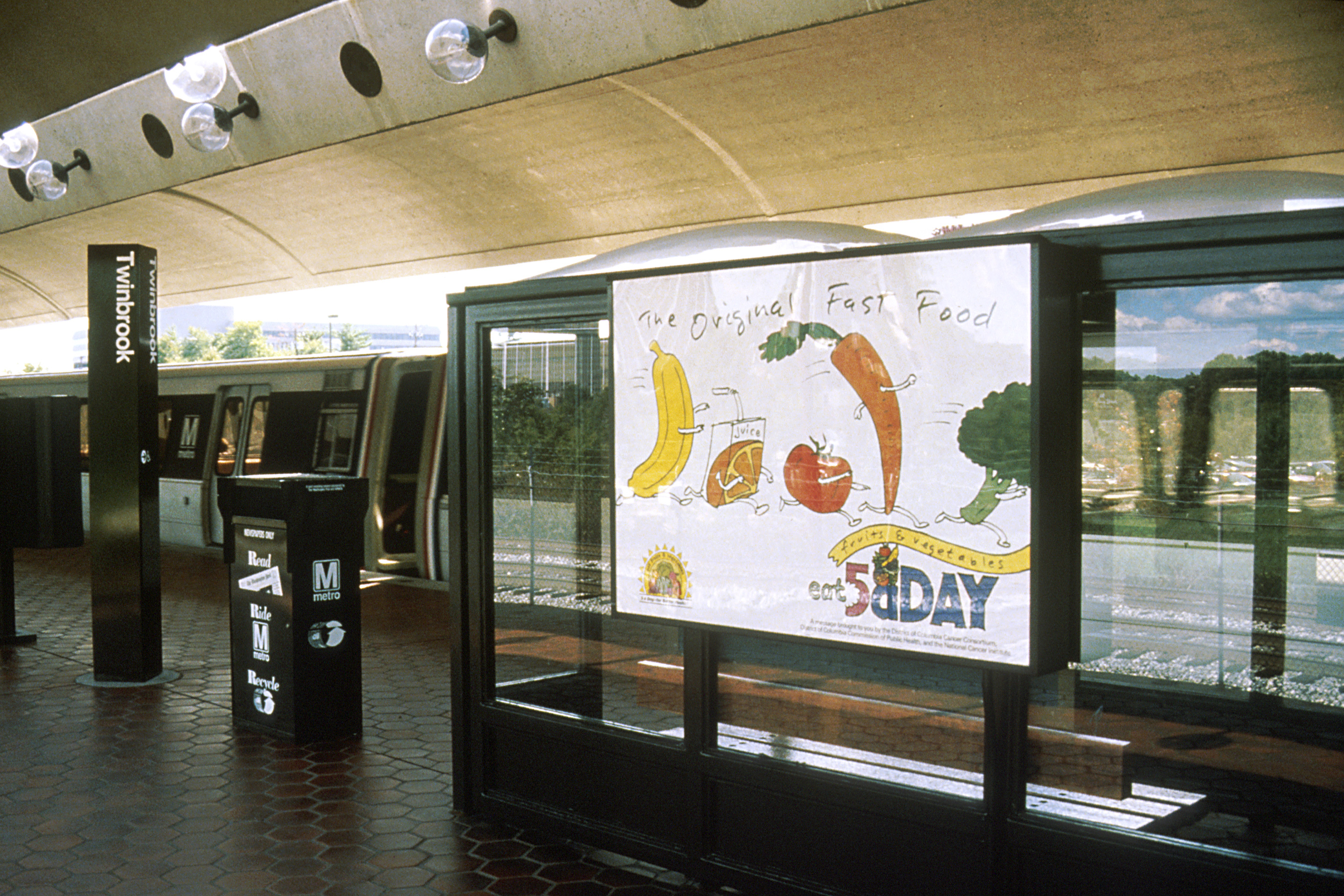
Poster campaign by the National Institutes of Health

5 A Day is any of various national campaigns in developed countries such as the United States, the United Kingdom, France, and Germany, to encourage the consumption of at least five portions of 80 g of fruit and vegetables each day, following a recommendation by the World Health Organization that individuals consume "a minimum of 400g of fruit and vegetables per day (excluding potatoes and other starchy tubers)." A meta-analysis of the many studies of this issue was published in 2017 and found that consumption of double the minimum recommendation – 800g or ten a day – provided an increased protection against all forms of mortality. In some places, people are being encouraged to aim for not just five portions a day, but seven.

== Support ==
Eating fruit and vegetables improves health and well being. Increasing vegetable intake to this desired level has a variety of major and minor health benefits. Benefits include reduction in the risk of many types of cancer, hypertension, heart disease, stroke, and diabetes. The National Cancer Institute provided research for the program, while the Produce for Better Health Foundation implemented the program into the food service industry.

== International campaigns ==
=== Australia ===
Go for 2 & 5 is the equivalent campaign in Australia, in which adults are said to need to eat at least two servings of fruit and five servings of vegetables each day. A "standard serving of fruit" is 150 grams of fresh fruit, whereas a "standard serve of vegetables" is 75 grams.

=== Canada ===
In Canada, the Canadian Produce Marketing Association (CPMA), the Heart and Stroke Foundation's Health Check Program, and the Canadian Cancer Society have partnered together to create the Fruits and Veggies — Mix it up! campaign, encouraging Canadian families to eat more healthily. The campaign focuses on easy ways for people to eat healthy wherever and whenever they can.

=== France ===
The French PNNS (Programme national nutrition santé, National nutrition health programme) recommends at least five portions of fruit and/or vegetables per day.

=== Germany ===
The 5 am Tag (5 a Day) program operates in Germany.

=== Japan ===
The 5 A Day campaign in Japan is administered by an NPO: 5 A DAY Association-Japan (一般社団法人 ファイブ・ア・デイ協会). The program recommends five servings a day totaling 350 grams of vegetables and 200 grams of fruit.

=== New Zealand ===
5 A Day is also known as 5 + A Day in New Zealand. 5 + A Day was founded in New Zealand in 1994 by non-profit United Fresh New Zealand and became a Charitable Trust in 2007.

=== Norway ===
Fem om dagen (five a day) is the Norwegian Directorate for Health recommendation to eat five portions of fruit, berries or vegetables each day.

=== United Kingdom ===
The National Health Service explains a "portion" to be: two or more small-sized, one piece of medium-sized or half a piece of large fresh fruit; or two broccoli spears or four heaped tablespoons of cooked kale, spinach, spring greens or green beans; or three heaped tablespoons of cooked vegetables; or 1.5 sticks of celery, a 5 cm piece of cucumber, one medium tomato or seven cherry tomatoes; or three or more heaped tablespoons of beans or pulses.

The programme was introduced by the UK Department of Health in the winter of 2002–2003, and received some adverse media attention because of the high and rising costs of fresh fruit and vegetables. After ten years, research suggested that few people were meeting the target.

The campaign has come under criticism from Channel 4 because of government failure to prevent the food industry from claiming that their products constitute part of a five a day despite having added salt, sugar or fat.

In April 2014, a study by University College London concluded that '5 a day' was not enough and that a healthy diet should contain 7 or more portions of fruit and vegetables. Celebrity chef, Jamie Oliver, recommended between 7-11 portions of fruits and vegetables.

=== United States ===
The 5 a Day program in the United States was originally the National Fruit and Vegetable Program but was rebranded Fruits & Veggies – More Matters in March 2007.

== See also ==
- Food and Nutrition Service
- Food groups
- Food pyramid
- Fruits & Veggies - More Matters
- Healthy diet
- Healthy eating pyramid
- History of USDA nutrition guides
- Human nutrition
- MyPlate
- MyPyramid
