= Dietary Guidelines Advisory Committee =

The Dietary Guidelines Advisory Committee (DGAC) is a panel of experts appointed by the US Department of Health and Human Services (HHS) and the US Department of Agriculture (USDA) under the Federal Advisory Committee Act to review scientific evidence on nutrition and health. Its scientific reports contribute to development of the Dietary Guidelines for Americans.

== Responsibilities ==
The DGAC's primary responsibilities include:

- Conducting systematic reviews of nutrition research through the Nutrition Evidence Systematic Review (NESR).
- Analyzing national dietary intake data from sources such as the National Health and Nutrition Examination Survey (NHANES).
- Evaluating dietary patterns and health outcomes using food pattern modeling.
- Preparing a scientific advisory report that is submitted to HHS and USDA, which informs the final Dietary Guidelines for Americans.

== Analysis and criticism ==
A 2022 article published in PNAS Nexus argued that the process behind the 2020-2025 DGAC lacked transparency, scientific rigor, and committee independence, and failed to fully implement reforms recommended by the National Academies of Sciences, Engineering, and Medicine. A peer-reviewed study published in Public Health Nutrition in 2022 found that 95% of the DGAC members (19 out of 20) had conflicts of interest with the food and/or pharmaceutical industries.

== See also ==
- HHS Office of Disease Prevention and Health Promotion
- USDA FNS Center for Nutrition Policy and Promotion
