= MyPyramid =

US federal nutrition guide used from 2005-2011

The final food guide pyramid, called "MyPyramid"

MyPyramid, released by the USDA Center for Nutrition Policy and Promotion on April 19, 2005, was an update on the earlier American food guide pyramid. It was used by the USDA until June 2, 2011, when MyPlate replaced it. The icon stresses activity and moderation along with a proper mix of food groups in one's diet. As part of the MyPyramid food guidance system, consumers were asked to visit the MyPyramid website for personalized nutrition information. Significant changes from the previous food pyramid include:

- Inclusion of a new symbol—a person on the stairs—representing physical activity.
- Measuring quantities in cups and ounces instead of servings.

MyPyramid was designed to educate consumers about a lifestyle consistent with the January 2005 Dietary Guidelines for Americans, an 80-page document. The guidelines, produced jointly by the USDA and Department of Health and Human Services (HHS), represented the official position of the U.S. government and served as the foundation of Federal nutrition policy.

== Overview ==
MyPyramid contained eight divisions. From left to right on the pyramid are a person and six food groups:

- Physical activity, represented by a person climbing steps on the pyramid, to illustrate moderate physical activity every day, in addition to usual activity. The key recommendations for 2005 (other specific recommendations are provided for children and adolescents, pregnant and breastfeeding women, for older adults and for weight maintenance) are:
  - Engage in regular physical activity and reduce sedentary activities to promote health, psychological well-being, and a healthy body weight. (At least 30 minutes on most, and if possible, every day for adults and at least 60 minutes each day for children and
    The five divisions of the pyramid
    teenagers, and for most people increasing to more vigorous-intensity or a longer duration will bring greater benefits.)
  - Achieve physical fitness by including cardiovascular conditioning, stretching exercises for flexibility, and resistance exercises or calisthenics for muscle strength and endurance.
- Grains, recommending that at least half of grains consumed be as whole grains (27%)
- Vegetables, emphasizing dark green vegetables, orange vegetables, and dry beans and peas (23%)
- Fruits, emphasizing variety and deemphasizing fruit juices (15%)
- Oils, recommending fish, nut, and vegetables sources (2%)
- Dairy, a category that includes fluid milk and many other milk-based products (23%)
- Proteins, emphasizing low-fat and lean meats such as fish as well as more beans, peas, nuts, and seeds (10%)

There is one other category:

- Discretionary calories, represented by the narrow tip of each colored band, including items such as candy, alcohol, or additional food from any other group.

== Themes ==
The USDA encoded six themes into the design of the MyPyramid icon. According to the USDA, MyPyramid incorporated:

- Personalization, demonstrated by the MyPyramid website. To find a personalized recommendation of the kinds and amounts of food to eat each day, individuals were instructed to visit MyPyramid.gov (now defunct).
- Gradual improvement, represented by the slogan Steps to a Healthier You. It suggests that individuals can benefit from taking small steps to improve their diet and lifestyle each day.
- Physical activity, represented by the steps and the person climbing them, as a reminder of the importance of daily exercise.
- Variety, symbolized by the six color bands representing the five food groups of MyPyramid and oils. Suggests that foods from all groups are needed each day for good health.
- Moderation, represented by the narrowing of each food group from bottom to top. The wider base stands for foods with little or no solid fats, added sugars, or caloric sweeteners. Suggests these should be selected more often to get the most nutrition from calories consumed.
- Proportionality, shown by the different widths of the food group bands. The widths suggest how much food a person should choose from each group. The widths are just a general guide.

== Differences from the food guide pyramid ==
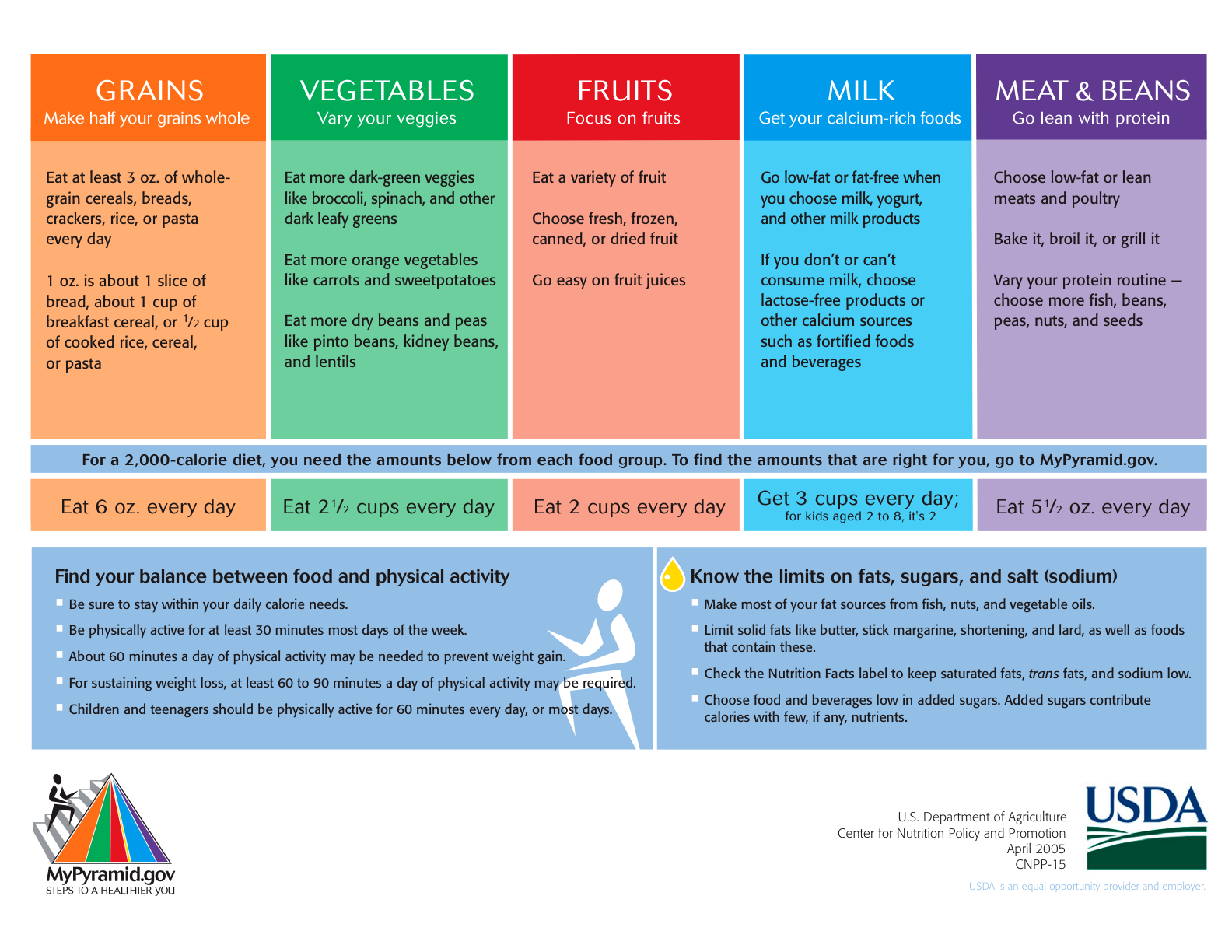
MyPyramid miniposter with sample food group recommendations

In a departure from its predecessor the food guide pyramid, no foods are pictured on the MyPyramid logo itself. Instead, colored vertical bands represent different food groups. Additionally, the logo emphasizes physical activity by showing a person climbing steps on the side of the pyramid. MyPyramid was intentionally made simpler than the food guide pyramid after several USDA studies indicated that consumers widely misunderstood the original design. Consumers were asked to visit the (now defunct) MyPyramid.gov website for personalized nutrition information.

The food guide pyramid gave recommendations measured in serving sizes, which some people found confusing. MyPyramid gives its recommendations in common household measures, such as cups, ounces, and other measures that may be easier to understand.

The food guide pyramid gave a single set of specific recommendations for all people. In contrast, MyPyramid has 12 sets of possible recommendations, with the appropriate guide for an individual selected based on sex, age group, and activity level.

== Controversy and criticism ==
Some claim that the USDA was and is unduly influenced by political pressure exerted by lobbyists for food production associations, in particular dairy and meat. Some nutritionists and critics found MyPyramid overly complicated and difficult or impossible to teach.

== Development ==
In September 2005, a "child-friendly version" of the food pyramid graphic and food guidance system launched.

The research process and results used to create the MyPyramid Food Guidance System was documented in a supplemental issue of the Journal of Nutrition Education and Behavior published in November/December 2006.

== See also ==
- 5 A Day, more details on recommended fruit and vegetable portions
- Food and Nutrition Service
- Food groups
- Healthy diet
- Healthy eating pyramid, an alternative designed to address criticism of the food guide pyramid
- History of USDA nutrition guides
- Human nutrition
- Society for Nutrition Education
