= Dietary Guidelines for Americans =

Nutritional advice for Americans

The 2025–2030 guidelines were announced January 7, 2026, with the cover depicting the New Pyramid.

The Dietary Guidelines for Americans (DGA) is a United States government publication which promulgates nutrition advice for Americans. First released in 1980, the guidelines have been revised every five years, with the 10th edition released in January 2026. The guidelines are published by the Department of Agriculture (USDA) Center for Nutrition Policy and Promotion, together with the Department of Health and Human Services (HHS) Office of Disease Prevention and Health Promotion.

In addition to the Dietary Guidelines, the report includes additional tools for assessing diet and nutrition, including the Healthy Eating Index (HEI), which can be used to assess the quality of a given selection of foods in the context of the Dietary Guidelines. Also provided are additional explanations regarding customization of the Guidelines to individual eating preferences, application of the Guidelines during pregnancy and infancy, the USDA Nutrition Evidence Systematic Review, information about the Nutrition Communicators Network and the New Pyramid initiative, information from the National Academies about redesigning the process by which the Dietary Guidelines for Americans are created, and information about dietary guidelines from other nations.

The stated purpose of the Dietary Guidelines for Americans is to help health professionals and policymakers to advise Americans about healthy choices for their diet. Historically the DGA has faced criticism for its uniform approach to nutrition advice, and longstanding allegations that it is biased toward special interests within the food and agriculture industries.

By law, the DGA is the core scientific rationale used for allocating spending in U.S. federal social welfare programs including SNAP, WIC, Meals on Wheels, and the National School Lunch Program. It is also used to set nutrition targets for the Department of Defense's Meal, Ready-to-Eat (MRE) rations, humanitarian aid, and myriad other public and private sector food and nutrition programs use it to guide decisions and spending.

== History ==
The efforts of the US Federal Government to establish a scientific basis for human nutrition began with Wilbur Olin Atwater, who published the first dietary recommendations for Americans in 1894, notably stating that, "We live not upon what we eat, but upon what we digest."

In 1977, despite limited and contradictory input from nutrition experts, the United States Senate Select Committee on Nutrition and Human Needs, chaired by Senator George McGovern, published the Dietary Goals for the United States, recommending that Americans avoid becoming obese by consuming only as much energy as was expended and to reverse obesity by decreasing energy intake and increasing energy expenditure. The Dietary Goals also recommended increasing complex carbohydrates and naturally occurring sugars from 28% to 48% of energy intake, reducing refined and processed sugars to about 10% of energy intake, reducing fat from 40% to 30% of energy intake, reducing eating saturated fat to 10% of energy intake, reducing cholesterol consumption to 300 milligrams daily, and reducing salt intake to 5 grams daily. The 1977 Dietary Goals for the United States were not based on a consensus among scientists and for this reason were criticized by agriculture and food manufacturing interests, and also by some scientists. A second version of the report was published in 1980, with less stringent changes from the standard American diet.

The Dietary Guidelines for Americans has been published every five years beginning in 1980, producing nine guidelines to date. One consistent recommendation of these nine guidelines has been that Americans reduce their dietary consumption of fat and animal products, including meat, dairy, and eggs and to increase their dietary consumption of carbohydrates and plant foods, including fruits, vegetables, and grains. The 2025-2030 guidelines, however, differ drastically by encouraging consumption of meat, dairy, and a priority on protein consumption.

== Purpose ==
The Guidelines were established so as to provide dietary advice that would improve the health of Americans and reduce their risk for chronic conditions, such as cancer, atherosclerosis, hypertension, heart disease, stroke, and renal disease. The Dietary Guidelines have the purpose of guiding the development of Federal policies and programs related to food, nutrition, and health. The guidelines influence and guide policymakers for Federally-financed food and dietary education programs. They also influence clinicians in the United States and in other countries.

The intended audience for the Dietary Guidelines for Americans are policymakers, nutrition scientists, and dieticians and other health professionals. The Guidelines themselves are not intended to directly inform the general public, but instead to serve as an authoritative, evidence-based information source that policymakers and health professionals can use to advise Americans about making healthy choices in their daily lives so as to enjoy a healthy diet that also prevents chronic disease. The Dietary Guidelines for Americans provide an evidence base that is used by the Federal government to develop nutrition education materials for Americans.

Federal law and regulation require that Federal government publications provide dietary guidance consistent with the Dietary Guidelines for Americans. For the United States Department of Agriculture (USDA) the guidelines provide the scientific rationale for the National School Lunch Program and School Breakfast Program, feeding 30 million children every school day, and the Special Supplemental Nutrition Program for Women, Infants and Children, which has 8 million beneficiaries. For the United States Department of Health and Human Services Administration on Aging, the guidelines provide the rationale for the Older Americans Act Nutrition Services programs which include more than 5,000 community-based nutrition service providers (e.g., Meals on Wheels), serving more than 900,000 meals a day across the United States. The Department of Defense uses the guidelines as the rationale for meal rations for military personnel and the Department of Veterans Affairs uses the guidelines to inform nutrition education for veterans who are patients of the VA Hospital System. In addition to these governmental audiences, the Dietary Guidelines for Americans are widely used by state and local governments, schools, commercial enterprises, community groups, the media, and the food industry to inform policy and program development intended to serve the general public.

== 2025–2030 guidelines ==
The New Pyramid promulgated by the 2026 DGA.

The current 2025–2030 guidelines were released in January 2026. The United States Department of Health and Human Services, led by Robert F. Kennedy Jr., presented the guidelines as "historic reset". Kennedy himself at that time followed and promoted a carnivore diet.

In a review of the guidelines, the Stanford University Prevention Research Center's Nutrition Studies Research Group endorsed parts of the guidelines for reaffirming the consumption of vegetables and whole grains and advice to limit added sugars and processed foods, but criticized what it claimed was an overemphasis on protein, downplaying of fiber, and complained of inconsistent recommendations about saturated fat. The 2025-2030 guidelines affirm the recommendation of limiting saturated fat (SFA) intake within 10% of total energy intake but simultaneously recommends intake of red meat and full-fat dairy rich in SFA that has led to public confusion. The 2025–2030 guidelines have been criticized for disregarding long-standing evidence on increased cardiovascular and cancer risks associated with high consumption of red and processed meat.

On February 8, 2026, during Super Bowl LX, an advertisement featuring the guidelines featured Mike Tyson, which encouraged viewers to avoid processed foods. The advertisement also pointed to RealFood.gov. On X, Kennedy called the advertisement "the most important message in Super Bowl history."

== 2020–2025 guidelines ==
The 2020–2025 edition gives four overarching guidelines: Follow a healthy dietary pattern throughout life; use nutrient-dense food and beverages to reflect personal preferences, cultural traditions, and budgetary considerations; meet dietary food group needs with nutrient-dense foods and beverages within calorie limits; and limit foods and beverages with higher added sugars, saturated fat, and sodium, and limit alcoholic beverages. In support of these four guidelines, the key recommendations are: avoid added sugars for infants and toddlers and limit added sugars to less than 10% of calories for those 2 years old and older; limit saturated fat to less than 10% of calories starting at age 2; limit sodium to less than 2,300 mg per day (or even less if younger than 14) and limit alcoholic beverages (if consumed) to 2 drinks or less daily for men and 1 drink or less a daily for women.

=== Principles for Current Guidelines ===
The Dietary Guidelines for Americans (2020–2025) outline four principles for healthy eating habits:

1. Dietary patterns should shift with each stage of life
2. Enjoy nutrient-rich food and beverages that adhere to one's budget and reflect one's personal preferences and cultural traditions
3. Meet food group needs and stay within calorie limits
4. Limit added sugars, saturated fat, sodium, and alcoholic beverages

=== How dietary patterns should shift with each stage of life ===
Healthy dietary patterns shift after the first 6 and 12 months of life. The Guidelines recommend:

- In about the first 6 months, infants should be fed exclusively human milk. Breastfeeding should continue through at least the first year of life, and longer if desired. If human milk is unavailable, infants should receive iron-fortified infant formula. In addition, infants should begin receiving vitamin D supplementation shortly after birth.
- At about 6 months, infants should be introduced to nutrient-dense, complementary (and perhaps allergenic) foods. Infants and toddlers should be encouraged to consume foods across all food groups, and their food should be rich in iron and zinc.
- From 12 months through adulthood, one should continue to consume nutrient-dense foods across all food groups. Examples of nutrient-dense foods listed in the 2020-2025 Guidelines are the same as those listed in the 2015–2020 Guidelines, with the addition of oils, such as vegetable oils and oils in food (i.e., seafood and nuts).

=== Recommended diet limitations ===
- Added sugars--Avoid before age 2. Starting at age 2, less than 10% of calories per day
- Saturated fat--Starting at age 2, less than 10% of calories per day
- Sodium--Less than 2,300 milligrams per day, and even less for children younger than age 14
- Alcoholic beverages--Adults of legal drinking age can choose not to drink or to limit their alcoholic intake to 2 drinks or less in a day for men and 1 drink or less in a day for women. It is better for your health to drink less. Some adults should not drink alcohol at all, such as pregnant women.

=== Background ===
The Trump administration had proposed a budget of more than $12 million for the 2020-2025 guidelines for the evaluation of scientific evidence, development of the Dietary Guidelines for Americans, and dissemination of the new edition to its target audience of policymakers, nutrition experts, and clinicians; this budget request has been supported by multiple organizations.

In June, 2020, a letter was sent to the U.S. Department of Agriculture and the U.S. Department of Health and Human Services from The Nutrition Coalition, describing serious problems observed by one or more whistleblowers. According to this letter, these whistleblowers, who were members of the Dietary Guidelines Advisory Committee (DGAC), reported that there had been inadequate time to complete scientific reviews, that some reviews were deleted and some were added by the DGAC without giving the required public notice, that there were inconsistencies in how scientific evidence was evaluated across the various DGAC subcommittees. Also noted was that the DGAC had rejected the reforms that had been recommended by the National Academies of Sciences, Engineering, and Medicine (NASEM), that important scientific evidence had been excluded from consideration by the DGAC, including studies of weight loss and also studies of low-carbohydrate diets, and that communication restrictions had been in place among members of the DGAC.

In 2022, the National Academies of Sciences, Engineering, and Medicine issued a new "mid-course correction" report evaluating how well the USDA has followed their 2016 recommendations. Six of the seven recommendations made by the NASEM in 2017 have not been fully adopted; one recommendation could not be assessed by the NASEM.

== 2015–2020 guidelines ==
MyPlate visualized the 2015 guidelines.

The Dietary Guidelines for Americans (2015–2020) were developed in three stages, beginning with a review of scientific evidence, followed by development of the guidelines, and finally with implementation of the guidelines. Compared to previous guidelines, the 2015–2020 guidelines emphasized replacing saturated fats with unsaturated fats, particularly polyunsaturated fats, with the goal of preventing heart attack and stroke (see lipid hypothesis).

The guidelines provide a general recommendation that people follow a healthy eating pattern with appropriate calories, and that the evaluation of one's eating pattern accounts for all foods and beverages, including snacks. The recommended healthy eating pattern includes:

Include these in diet:

- A broad selection of vegetables, including dark green, red and orange, legumes (beans and peas), starches (potatoes, squash, etc.), and others
- An emphasis on whole fruits
- An emphasis on whole grains
- Dairy products that are either fat-free or low fat, including milk, yogurt, cheese, and fortified soy beverages
- Protein foods to include seafood, lean meats, poultry, eggs, legumes (beans and peas), and nuts, seeds, and soy products

Limit these in diet:

- Trans fats
- Saturated fats to less than 10% of calories
- Added sugars to less than 10% of calories
- Sodium to less than 2.3 g/day (5.8 g of salt/day), including both added table salt and salt in foods
- If consumed, use alcohol in moderation and only for adults — up to 1 drink daily for women and 2 drinks daily for men.

The Dietary Guidelines also include a key recommendation to meet the Physical Activity Guidelines for Americans.

The MyPlate initiative, based on the recommendations of the 2015–2020 Dietary Guidelines for Americans and produced by the USDA Center for Nutrition Policy and Promotion, is a nutrition education program directed at the general public, providing a guide to "finding healthy eating solutions to fit your lifestyle."

== Criticisms of the 2015–2020 Guidelines ==
Each edition of the Dietary Guidelines for Americans has had attendant controversy, with objections particularly from scientists whose point-of-view was not reflected in the guidelines and from commercial interests negatively affected by the recommendations therein. The response to the 2015–2020 guidelines was particularly contentious, resulting in action by Congress mandating the National Academies of Sciences, Engineering, and Medicine to evaluate the process used to update the DGA. This review by the National Academies resulted in two reports. The first report, entitled "Optimizing the Process for Establishing the Dietary Guidelines for Americans: The Selection Process", identified opportunities for improving the process for selecting members of the Dietary Guidelines Advisory Committee. In September 2018, the USDA issued an official response to the first report of the National Academies committee. The second report from National Academies of Sciences, entitled "Redesigning the Process for Establishing the Dietary Guidelines for Americans", offers an exhaustive review and provides recommendations for improving the process of revising the Dietary Guidelines so as to best identify, analyze, and present the scientific evidence.

=== Methodology ===
There is compelling evidence that food frequency questionnaires and other methods that rely on human memory do not accurately measure dietary intake. An analysis of the validity of the methods used by the USDA to estimate per capita calorie consumption found that these methods lack validity and the authors of this study recommend that these methods not be used to inform public policy. A systematic review found that only a few studies have measured the accuracy or reliability of dietary assessment methods in schoolchildren. The few studies that have been done found that schoolchildren did not accurately report foods consumed but that they did accurately report total calories consumed. The 2015 Guidelines were based on the Scientific Report of the 2015 Dietary Guidelines Advisory Committee, which did not rely on actual measurements of dietary intake but instead relied on memory-based dietary assessments, including interviews and surveys despite clear evidence that such methods markedly underestimate actual calorie consumption and nutrient intake. Thus, the conclusions expressed in the Scientific Report have been criticized, and the Dietary Guidelines for Americans are considered invalid by some experts, as the DGAs rely on invalid methods and draw conclusions that do not agree with the available scientific literature.

=== Dietary salt restriction ===
The Dietary Guidelines for Americans have been criticized for recommending a diet that contains less than 2.3 grams of sodium (5.8 grams of salt/day). Notably, 95% of the world's populations have a mean intake of salt that is between 6g and 12g daily and evidence on the health effects of salt does not support such a severe restriction on salt intake. An analysis of dietary guidelines found that this recommendation for restriction of salt intake is not supported by evidence from randomized controlled trials nor is it supported by evidence from prospective observational studies. The authors of this analysis suggest a redesign of the dietary guidelines for salt intake is needed.

A Committee of the National Academies Institute of Medicine evaluated the evidence about dietary salt intake and health. Overall, the committee found evidence that higher salt intake was associate with increased risk of cardiovascular disease. However, the committee also found that the evidence did not support the claim that lowering sodium intake in the general population to less than 2,300 mg/day was associated with a lower risk of death nor with a higher risk of death.

=== Alcoholic beverage consumption ===
The Dietary Guidelines for Americans recommend limiting alcoholic beverages consumption to no more than 1 drink daily for women and no more than 2 drinks daily for men. The 2015–2020 Scientific Report of the Dietary Guidelines Advisory Committee asserts that most studies show that moderate consumption of alcohol has been shown to be part of a beneficial dietary pattern. However, a systematic review and meta-analysis of scientific studies of alcohol consumption and all-cause mortality found that consumption of up to 2 alcoholic beverages per day had no net mortality benefit compared with lifetime abstention from alcohol. A systematic analysis of data from the Global Burden of Disease study found that consumption of ethanol increases the risk of cancer and increases the risk of all-cause mortality, and that the level of ethanol consumption that minimizes disease is zero consumption.

The Guidelines recommend that people not mix alcohol and beverages containing caffeine, as this combined intake may result in greater alcohol consumption, with a greater risk of alcohol-related injury.

=== Classification of honey and maple syrup as "added sugars" ===
Producers of honey and maple syrup have objected to the proposed Federal regulatory requirement that honey and maple syrup include the term "added sugar" on product labeling, despite the fact that no additional sugar is added to these products. This regulatory requirement follows from the recommendation in the 2015–2020 Guidelines that added sugars be limited to less than 10% of calories and that honey and maple syrup are themselves considered by federal regulators to be added sugars.

== See also ==
- Food pyramid (nutrition)
- List of nutrition guides
- Dietary Reference Intake
