= Healthy eating pyramid =

Nutrition guide developed by the Harvard School of Public Health

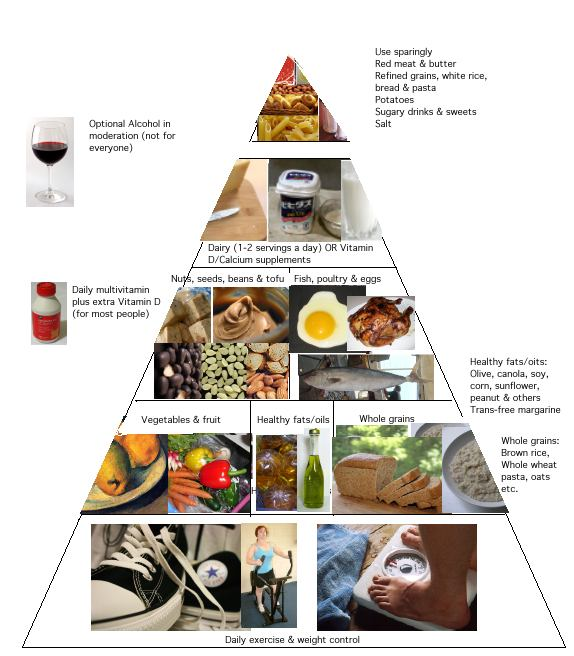
A healthy eating pyramid

The Healthy Eating Pyramid (alternately, Healthy Eating Plate) is a nutrition guide developed by the Harvard School of Public Health, suggesting quantities of each food category that a human should eat each day. The healthy eating pyramid is intended to provide a more sound eating guide than the widespread food guide pyramid created by the USDA.

The new pyramid aims to include more recent research in dietary health not present in the USDA's 1992 guide. The original USDA pyramid has been criticized for not differentiating between refined grains and whole grains, between saturated fats and unsaturated fats, and for not placing enough emphasis on exercise and weight control.

== Food groups ==
In general terms, the healthy eating pyramid recommends the following intake of different food groups each day, although exact amounts of calorie intake depends on sex, age, and lifestyle:

- At most meals, whole grain foods including oatmeal, whole-wheat bread, and brown rice; 1 piece or 4 ounces (110 g).
- Plant oils, including olive oil, canola oil, soybean oil, corn oil, and sunflower seed oil; 2 ounces (60 g) per day
- Vegetables, in abundance 3 or more each day; each serving = 6 ounces (170 g).
- 2–3 servings of fruits; each serving = 1 piece of fruit or 4 ounces (110 g).
- 1–3 servings of nuts, or legumes; each serving = 2 ounces (60 g).
- 1–2 servings of dairy or calcium supplement; each serving = 8 ounces (230 g) non fat or 4 ounces (110 g) of whole.
- 1–2 servings of poultry, fish, or eggs; each serving = 4 ounces (110 g) or 1 egg.
- Sparing use of white rice, white bread, potatoes, pasta and sweets;
- Sparing use of red meat and butter.

== See also ==
- 5 A Day
- Dietary supplement
- Dieting
- List of diets
- Essential nutrient
- Food and Nutrition Service
- Food pyramid (nutrition)
- Functional food
- Healthy diet
- Human nutrition
- MyPlate
- Nutrition education
- Orthorexia nervosa (an obsession with healthy eating)
