= Food group =

Collection of foods with similar properties

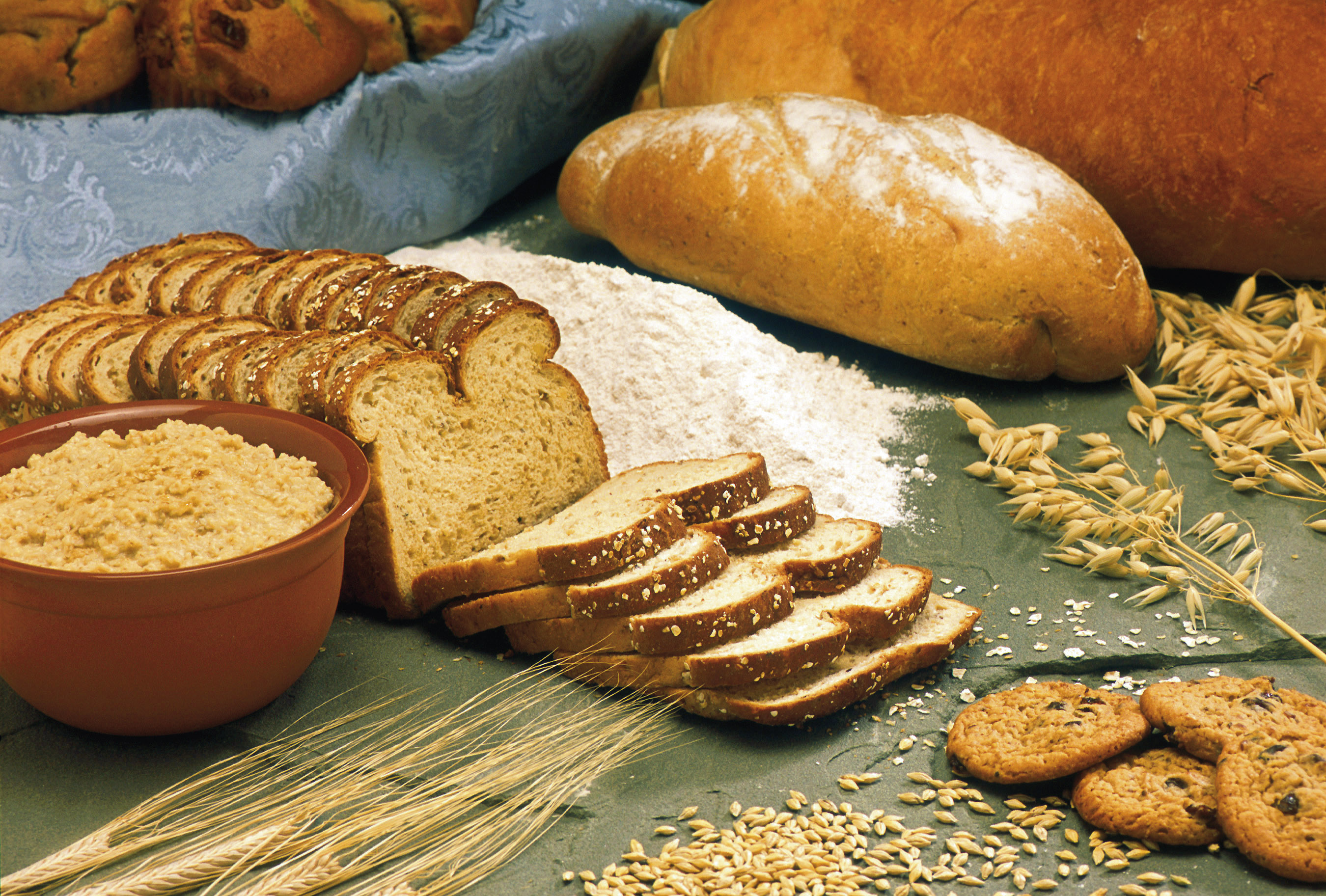
Grains, the largest food group in many nutrition guides, includes oats, barley and bread. Cookies, however, are categorized as sugar.

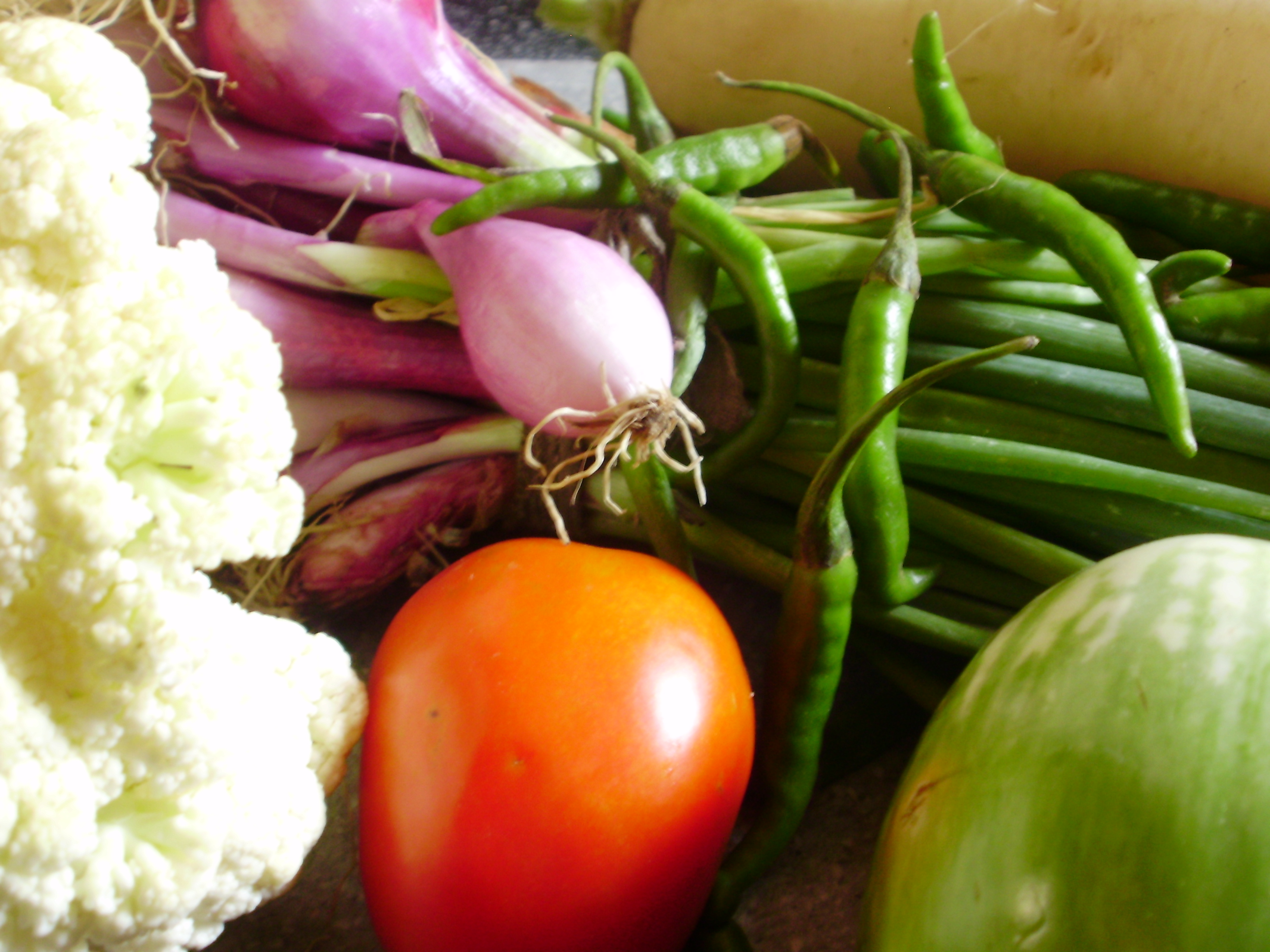
Vegetables, the second largest food group in many nutrition guides, come in a wide variety of shapes, colors and sizes.

Food groups categorise foods for educational purposes, usually grouping together foods with similar nutritional properties or biological classifications. Food groups are often used in nutrition guides, although the number of groups used can vary widely.

Food groups were a public health education concept invented to teach people eating very restricted, unvaried diets how to avoid becoming deficient in specific nutrients. They have since been adapted to also address diseases of affluence related to diet, such as obesity, diabetes and heart disease.

== Historical food groups ==
Opson and sitos were Classical Greek food groups, mainly used for moral education, to teach sophrosyne. Mitahara, a concept of moderate diet found in early-first-millennium Sanskrit texts, categorizes food into groups and recommends eating a variety of healthy foods, while avoiding the unhealthy ones; it also considers foods to have emotional and moral effects. Indian foodways had a substantial influence on European organisations such as the Vegetarian Society, which cited Indian diets as proof that a healthy vegetarian diet was possible, and were actively involved in public debate on nutrition.

In the 20th century, food groups became widely used in public health education, as a tool to reduce nutritional deficiencies.

As early as the 1980s, researchers were criticizing food groups, saying that they were a concept useful for teaching people to avoid nutritional deficiencies, but that nutritional deficiencies were no longer major causes of diet-related disease in affluent societies. Since these are caused by unhealthy food, not by diets lacking of a specific nutrient, they thought that food groups would have to be entirely discarded, or entirely revamped to make them useful in nutritional education in post-industrial countries.

=== United States ===
The USDA promoted eight basic food groups prior to 1943, then seven basic food groups until 1956, then four food groups. A food pyramid was introduced in 1992, then MyPyramid in 2005, MyPlate in 2011, and an inverted food pyramid in 2026. Dietary guidelines are revised every five years. Recommended Dietary Allowance recommends daily servings of each group for a healthy diet. In the United States for instance, the USDA has described food as being in from 4 to 11 different groups.

== The most common food groups ==
- Dairy, also called milk products and sometimes categorized with milk alternatives or meat, is typically a smaller category in nutrition guides, if present at all, and is sometimes listed apart from other food groups. Examples of dairy products include milk, butter, ghee, yogurt, cheese, cream and ice cream. The categorization of dairy as a food group with recommended daily servings has been criticized by, for example, the Harvard School of Public Health who point out that "research has shown little benefit, and considerable potential for harm, of such high dairy intakes. Moderate consumption of milk or other dairy products—one to two servings a day—is fine, and likely has some benefits for children. But it’s not essential for adults, for a host of reasons."
- Fruits, sometimes categorized with vegetables, include apples, oranges, bananas, berries and lemons. Fruits contain carbohydrates, mostly in the form of non-free sugar, as well as important vitamins and minerals.
- Cereals and legumes, sometimes categorized as grains, is often the largest category in nutrition guides. Cereal examples include wheat, rice, oats, barley, bread and pasta. Legumes are also known as pulses and include beans, soy beans, lentils and chickpeas. Cereals are a good source of starch and are often categorized with other starchy food such as potatoes. Legumes are good source of essential amino acids as well as carbohydrates.
- Meat, sometimes labelled protein and occasionally inclusive of legumes and beans, eggs, meat analogues and/or dairy, is typically a medium- to smaller-sized category in nutrition guides. Examples include chicken, fish, turkey, pork and beef.
- Confections, also called sugary foods and sometimes categorized with fats and oils, is typically a very small category in nutrition guides, if present at all, and is sometimes listed apart from other food groups. Examples include candy, soft drinks, and chocolate.
- Vegetables, sometimes categorized with fruit and occasionally inclusive of legumes, is typically a large category second only to grains, or sometimes equal or superior to grains, in nutrition guides. Examples include spinach, carrots, onions, and broccoli.
- Water is treated in very different ways by different food guides. Some exclude the category, others list it separately from other food groups, and yet others make it the center or foundation of the guide. Water is sometimes categorized with tea, fruit juice, vegetable juice and even soup, and is typically recommended in plentiful amounts.

== Uncommon food groups ==
The number of "common" food groups varies depending on who is defining them. Canada's Food Guide, which has been in continual publication since 1942 and is the second most requested government document after the income tax form in Canada, recognizes only four official food groups, listing the remainder of foods as "another".

== See also ==
- Table of food nutrients
- Human nutrition
