= C18H30O2 =

The molecular formula C_{18}H_{30}O_{2} may refer to:

- Lamenallenic acid
- Octadecatrienoic acid
  - Calendic acid
  - Catalpic acid
  - α-Eleostearic acid
  - β-Eleostearic acid
  - Jacaric acid
  - α-Linolenic acid
  - γ-Linolenic acid
  - Pinolenic acid
  - Punicic acid
- Ximenynic acid
- Gorlic acid
- Ambermor Ketal IPM
