= Human nutrition =

Nutrients supporting human health

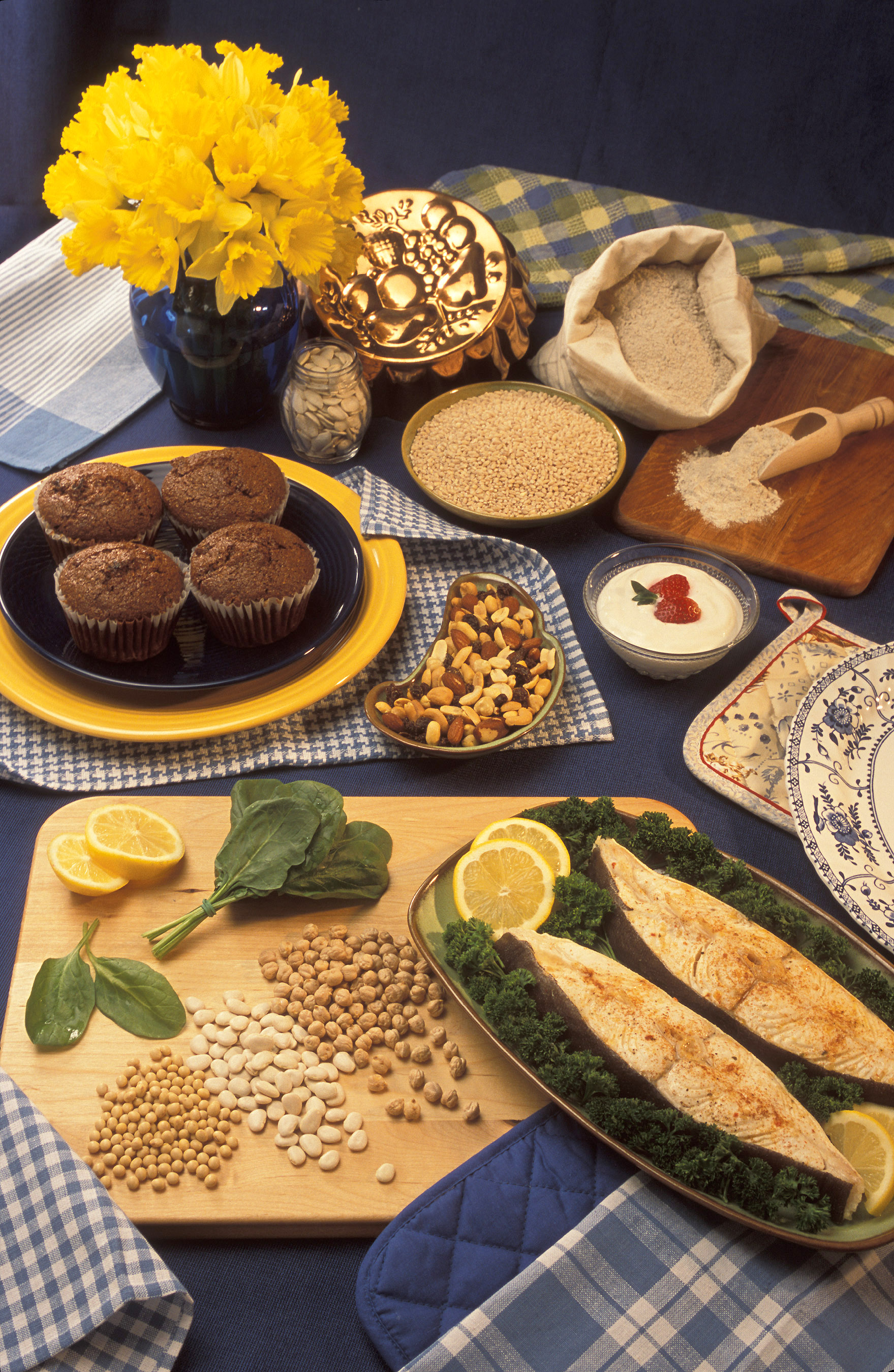
Foods high in magnesium (an example of a nutrient)

Human nutrition deals with the provision of essential nutrients in food that are necessary to support human life and good health. Poor nutrition is a chronic problem often linked to poverty, food security, or a poor understanding of nutritional requirements. Malnutrition and its consequences are large contributors to deaths, physical deformities, and disabilities worldwide. Good nutrition is necessary for children to grow physically and mentally, and for normal human biological development.

== Recommended Dietary Allowances ==
The Recommended Dietary Allowances (RDAs) are scientifically determined levels of essential nutrient intake, deemed sufficient by the Food and Nutrition Board to meet the nutritional needs of nearly all healthy individuals.

The first RDAs were published in 1943, during World War II, with the aim of setting standards for optimal nutrition. The initial editions outlined daily nutrient recommendations for various age groups, reflecting the latest scientific insights at the time (NRC, 1943). The history and evolution of the RDAs have been extensively detailed by the chair of the first Committee on Recommended Dietary Allowances (Roberts, 1958). Over the years, the RDAs have been periodically updated, with the current version being the tenth edition.

Originally intended to address nutrition issues related to national defense, the RDAs now serve multiple roles, including guiding food supply planning for population groups, interpreting dietary intake data, establishing standards for food assistance programs, assessing the nutritional adequacy of food supplies, designing nutrition education initiatives, aiding in the development of new food products, and setting guidelines for food labeling. However, the data underpinning these nutrient requirement estimates are often limited.

The nutritional requirements system adopted by the United States and Canada refers to Dietary Reference Intake (DRI). The DRI is a set of nutritional guidelines developed by the National Academy of Medicine (NAM), part of the National Academies in the United States. Established in 1997, the DRI was created to expand upon the previous standards known as the Recommended Dietary Allowances (RDAs). Unlike the RDAs, the DRI encompasses a broader range of nutritional recommendations. The DRI values are distinct from those found on food and dietary supplement labels in the U.S. and Canada, which use Reference Daily Intakes (RDIs) and Daily Values (%). These labeling standards were originally based on RDAs from 1968 but were updated in 2016.

Dietary Reference Values (DRVs) represent the nutritional standards set by the United Kingdom's Department of Health and the European Food Safety Authority (EFSA) for assessing and planning dietary intakes. The UK's Department of Health introduced these guidelines in 1991 with the publication of Dietary Reference Values for Food Energy and Nutrients for the United Kingdom. This document provides recommended nutrient intakes for the UK population, offering a framework for ensuring adequate nutrition.

DRVs are categorized into three main types: Reference Nutrient Intake (RNI), which covers the nutritional needs of 95% of the population; Estimated Average Requirement (EAR), meeting the needs of 50%; and Lower Recommended Nutritional Intake (LRNI), which addresses the requirements of 5% of the population. These categories help to tailor dietary recommendations to different segments of the population, ensuring a more personalized approach to nutrition.

== Nutrients ==
The seven major classes of nutrients are carbohydrates, fats, fiber, minerals, proteins, vitamins, and water. Nutrients can be grouped as either macronutrients or micronutrients (needed in small quantities). Carbohydrates, fats, and proteins are macronutrients, and provide energy. Water and fiber are macronutrients, but do not provide energy. The micronutrients are minerals and vitamins.

The macronutrients (excluding fiber and water) provide structural material (amino acids from which proteins are built, and lipids from which cell membranes and some signaling molecules are built), and energy. Some of the structural material can also be used to generate energy internally, and in either case it is measured in joules or kilocalories (often called "Calories" and written with a capital 'C' to distinguish them from little 'c' calories). Carbohydrates and proteins provide 17 kJ (approximately 4 kcal) of energy per gram, while fats provide 37 kJ (9 kcal) per gram. However, the net energy derived from the macronutrients depends on such factors as absorption and digestive effort, which vary substantially from instance to instance.

Vitamins, minerals, fiber, and water do not provide energy, but are required for other reasons. A third class of dietary material, fiber (i.e., nondigestible material such as cellulose), seems also to be required, for both mechanical and biochemical reasons, though the exact reasons remain unclear. For all age groups, males on average need to consume higher amounts of macronutrients than females. In general, intakes increase with age until the second or third decade of life.

Some nutrients can be stored – the fat-soluble vitamins – while others are required more or less continuously. Poor health can be caused by a lack of required nutrients, or for some vitamins and minerals, too much of a required nutrient. Essential nutrients cannot be synthesized by the body, and must be obtained from food.

Molecules of carbohydrates and fats consist of carbon, hydrogen, and oxygen atoms. Carbohydrates range from simple monosaccharides (glucose, fructose, galactose) to complex polysaccharides (starch, glycogen). Fats are triglycerides, made of assorted fatty acid monomers bound to a glycerol backbone. Some fatty acids, but not all, are essential in the diet: they cannot be synthesized in the body. Protein molecules contain nitrogen atoms in addition to carbon, oxygen, and hydrogen. The fundamental components of protein are nitrogen-containing amino acids, some of which are essential in the sense that humans cannot make them internally. Some of the amino acids can be converted (with the expenditure of energy) to glucose and can be used for energy production just as ordinary glucose, in a process known as gluconeogenesis. By breaking down existing protein, some glucose can be produced internally; the remaining amino acids are discarded, primarily as urea in urine. This occurs naturally when atrophy takes place, or during periods of starvation.

=== Carbohydrates ===
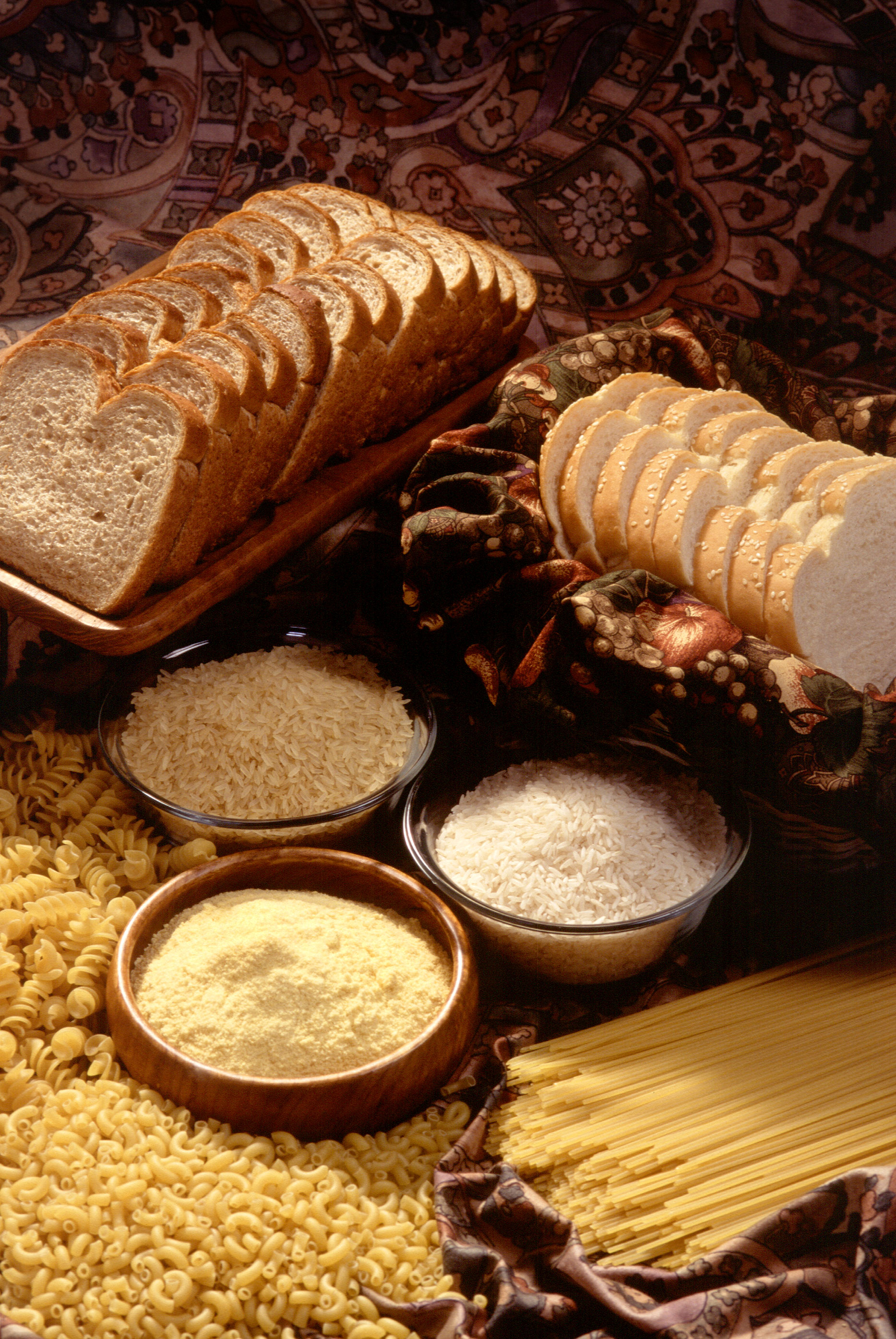
Grain products: rich sources of complex and simple carbohydrates

Carbohydrates may be classified as monosaccharides, disaccharides or polysaccharides depending on the number of monomer (sugar) units they contain. They are a diverse group of substances, with a range of chemical, physical and physiological properties. They make up a large part of foods such as rice, noodles, bread, and other grain-based products, but they are not an essential nutrient, meaning a human does not need to eat carbohydrates.

Monosaccharides contain one sugar unit, disaccharides two, and polysaccharides three or more. Monosaccharides include glucose, fructose and galactose. Disaccharides include sucrose, lactose, and maltose; purified sucrose, for instance, is used as table sugar. Polysaccharides, which include starch and glycogen, are often referred to as 'complex' carbohydrates because they are typically long multiple-branched chains of sugar units.

Traditionally, simple carbohydrates were believed to be absorbed quickly, and therefore raise blood-glucose levels more rapidly than complex carbohydrates. This is inaccurate. Some simple carbohydrates (e.g., fructose) follow different metabolic pathways (e.g., fructolysis) that result in only a partial catabolism to glucose, while, in essence, many complex carbohydrates may be digested at the same rate as simple carbohydrates. The World Health Organization recommends that added sugars should represent no more than 10% of total energy intake.

The most common plant carbohydrate nutrient – starch – varies in its absorption. Starches have been classified as rapidly digestible starch, slowly digestible starch and resistant starch. Starches in plants are resistant to digestion (resistant starch), but cooking the starch in the presence of water can break down the starch granule and releases the glucose chains, making them more easily digestible by human digestive enzymes. Historically, food was less processed and starches were contained within the food matrix, making them less digestible. Modern food processing has shifted carbohydrate consumption from less digestible and resistant starch to much more rapidly digestible starch. For instance, the resistant starch content of a traditional African diet was 38 grams/day. The resistant starch consumption from countries with high starch intakes has been estimated to be 30-40 grams/day. In contrast, the average consumption of resistant starch in the United States was estimated to be 4.9 grams/day (range 2.8-7.9 grams of resistant starch/day).

=== Fat ===
A molecule of dietary fat typically consists of several fatty acids (containing long chains of carbon and hydrogen atoms), bonded to a glycerol. They are typically found as triglycerides (three fatty acids attached to one glycerol backbone). Fats may be classified as saturated or unsaturated depending on the chemical structure of the fatty acids involved. Saturated fats have all of the carbon atoms in their fatty acid chains bonded to hydrogen atoms, whereas unsaturated fats have some of these carbon atoms double-bonded, so their molecules have relatively fewer hydrogen atoms than a saturated fatty acid of the same length. Unsaturated fats may be further classified as monounsaturated (one double-bond) or polyunsaturated (many double-bonds). Furthermore, depending on the location of the double-bond in the fatty acid chain, unsaturated fatty acids are classified as omega-3 or omega-6 fatty acids. Trans fats are a type of unsaturated fat with trans-isomer bonds; these are rare in nature and in foods from natural sources; they are typically created in an industrial process called (partial) hydrogenation. There are nine kilocalories in each gram of fat. Fatty acids such as conjugated linoleic acid, catalpic acid, eleostearic acid and punicic acid, in addition to providing energy, represent potent immune modulatory molecules.

Saturated fats (typically from animal sources) have been a staple in many world cultures for millennia. Unsaturated fats (e. g., vegetable oil) are considered healthier, while trans fats are to be avoided. Saturated and some trans fats are typically solid at room temperature (such as butter or lard), while unsaturated fats are typically liquids (such as olive oil or flaxseed oil). Trans fats are very rare in nature, and have been shown to be highly detrimental to human health, but have properties useful in the food processing industry, such as rancidity resistance.

==== Essential fatty acids ====
Most fatty acids are non-essential, meaning the body can produce them as needed, generally from other fatty acids and always by expending energy to do so. However, in humans, at least two fatty acids are essential and must be included in the diet. An appropriate balance of essential fatty acids—omega-3 and omega-6 fatty acids—seems also important for health, although definitive experimental demonstration has been elusive. Both of these "omega" long-chain polyunsaturated fatty acids are substrates for a class of eicosanoids known as prostaglandins, which have roles throughout the human body.

The omega-3 eicosapentaenoic acid (EPA), which can be made in the human body from the omega-3 essential fatty acid alpha-linolenic acid (ALA), or taken in through marine food sources, serves as a building block for series 3 prostaglandins (e.g., weakly inflammatory PGE3). The omega-6 dihomo-gamma-linolenic acid (DGLA) serves as a building block for series 1 prostaglandins (e.g. anti-inflammatory PGE1), whereas arachidonic acid (AA) serves as a building block for series 2 prostaglandins (e.g. pro-inflammatory PGE 2). Both DGLA and AA can be made from the omega-6 linoleic acid (LA) in the human body, or can be taken in directly through food. An appropriately balanced intake of omega-3 and omega-6 partly determines the relative production of different prostaglandins. In industrialized societies, people typically consume large amounts of processed vegetable oils, which have reduced amounts of the essential fatty acids along with too much of omega-6 fatty acids relative to omega-3 fatty acids.

The conversion rate of omega-6 DGLA to AA largely determines the production of the prostaglandins PGE1 and PGE2. Omega-3 EPA prevents AA from being released from membranes, thereby skewing prostaglandin balance away from pro-inflammatory PGE2 (made from AA) toward anti-inflammatory PGE1 (made from DGLA). The conversion (desaturation) of DGLA to AA is controlled by the enzyme delta-5-desaturase, which in turn is controlled by hormones such as insulin (up-regulation) and glucagon (down-regulation).

=== Fiber ===
Dietary fiber is a carbohydrate, specifically a polysaccharide, which is incompletely absorbed in humans and in some animals. Fiber slows down the absorption of sugar in the gut. The microbiome converts fiber into signals that stimulate gut hormones, which in turn control how quickly the stomach empties, regulate blood sugar levels, and influence feelings of hunger. Like all carbohydrates, when fiber is digested, it can produce four calories (kilocalories) of energy per gram, but in most circumstances, it accounts for less than that because of its limited absorption and digestibility.

The two subcategories are insoluble and soluble fiber.

Insoluble dietary fiber
Includes cellulose, a large carbohydrate polymer that is indigestible by humans, because humans do not have the required enzymes to break it down, and the human digestive system does not harbor enough of the types of microbes that can do so.
Includes resistant starch, an insoluble starch that resists digestion either because it is protected by a shell or food matrix (Type 1 resistant starch, RS1), maintains the natural starch granule (Type 2 resistant starch, RS2), is retrograded and partially crystallized (Type 3 resistant starch, RS3), has been chemically modified (Type 4 resistant starch, RS4) or has complexed with a lipid (Type 5 resistant starch, RS5). Natural sources of resistant starch (RS1, RS2 and RS3) are fermented by the microbes in the human digestive system to produce short-chain fatty acids which are utilized as food for the colonic cells or absorbed.

Soluble dietary fiber
Comprises a variety of oligosaccharides, waxes, esters, and other carbohydrates that dissolve or gelatinize in water. Many of these soluble fibers can be fermented or partially fermented by microbes in the human digestive system to produce short-chain fatty acids which are absorbed and therefore introduce some caloric content.

Whole grains, beans, and other legumes, fruits (especially plums, prunes, and figs), and vegetables are good sources of dietary fiber. Fiber has three primary mechanisms, which in general determine their health impact: bulking, viscosity and fermentation. Fiber provides bulk to the intestinal contents, and insoluble fiber facilitates peristalsis – the rhythmic muscular contractions of the intestines which move contents along the digestive tract. Some soluble and insoluble fibers produce a solution of high viscosity; this is essentially a gel, which slows the movement of food through the intestines. Fermentable fibers are used as food by the microbiome, mildly increasing bulk, and producing short-chain fatty acids and other metabolites, including vitamins, hormones, and glucose. One of these metabolites, butyrate, is important as an energy source for colon cells, and may improve metabolic syndrome.

In 2016, the U.S. FDA approved a qualified health claim stating that resistant starch might reduce the risk of type 2 diabetes, but with qualifying language for product labels that only limited scientific evidence exists to support this claim. The FDA requires specific labeling language, such as the guideline concerning resistant starch: "High-amylose maize resistant starch may reduce the risk of type 2 diabetes. FDA has concluded that there is limited scientific evidence for this claim."

=== Amino acids ===
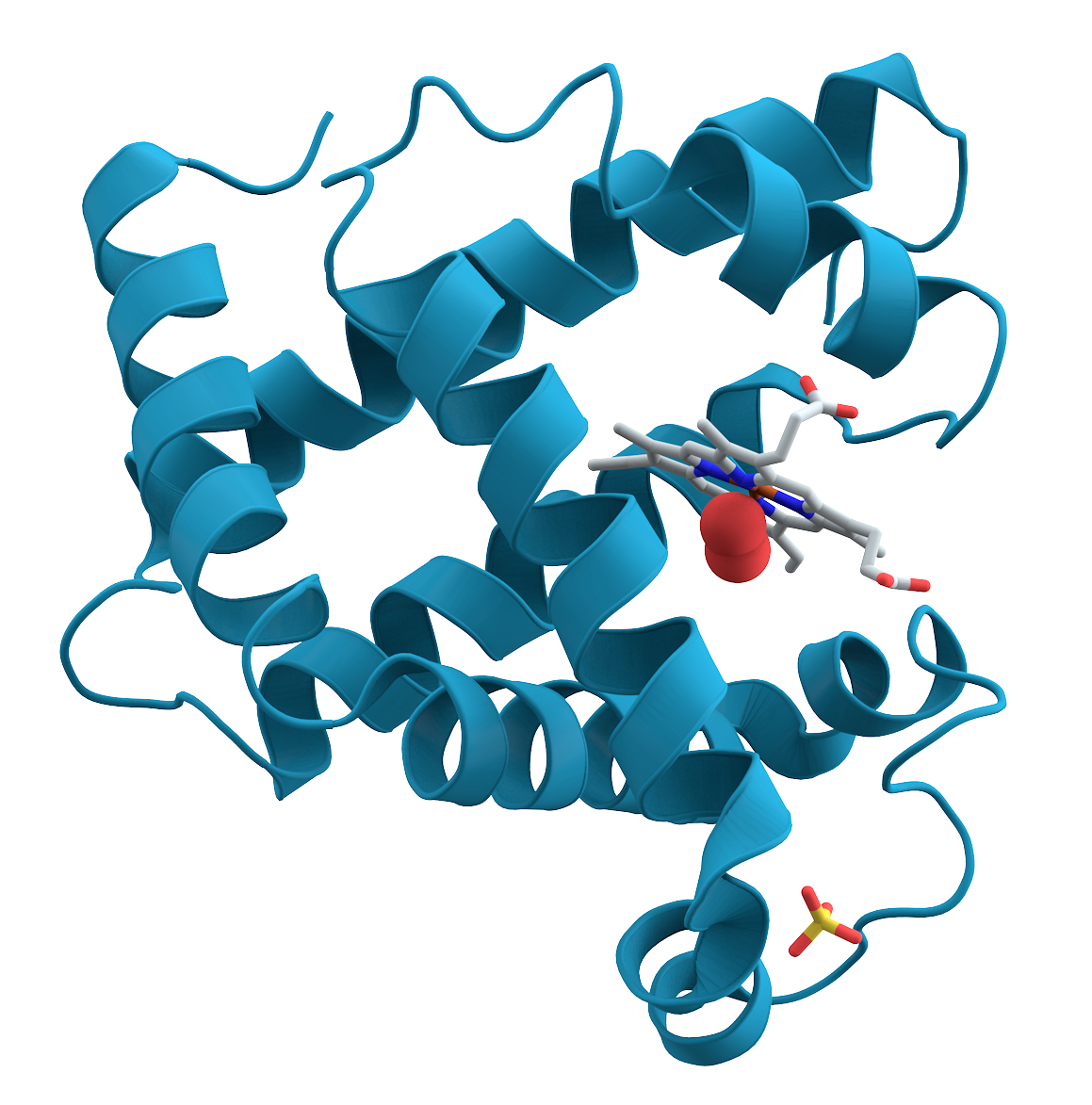
Proteins are chains of amino acids found in many nutritious foods. Pictured above is a computer rendering of myoglobin, a protein found in muscles.

Proteins are the basis of many animal body structures (e.g. muscles, skin, and hair) and form the enzymes that control chemical reactions throughout the body. Each protein molecule is composed of amino acids which contain nitrogen and sometimes sulphur (these components are responsible for the distinctive smell of burning protein, such as the keratin in hair). The body requires amino acids to produce new proteins (protein retention) and to replace damaged proteins (maintenance). Amino acids are soluble in the digestive juices within the small intestine, where they are absorbed into the blood. Once absorbed, they cannot be stored in the body, so they are either metabolized as required or excreted in the urine. Proteins consist of amino acids in different proportions. The most important aspect and defining characteristic of protein from a nutritional standpoint is its amino acid composition.

For all animals, some amino acids are essential (an animal cannot produce them internally so they must be eaten) and some are non-essential (the animal can produce them from other nitrogen-containing compounds). About twenty amino acids are found in the human body, and about ten of these are essential. The synthesis of some amino acids can be limited under special pathophysiological conditions, such as prematurity in the infant or individuals in severe catabolic distress, and those are called conditionally essential.

A diet that contains adequate amounts of amino acids (especially those that are essential) is particularly important in some situations: during early development and maturation, pregnancy, lactation, or injury (a burn, for instance). A complete protein source contains all the essential amino acids; an incomplete protein source lacks one or more of the essential amino acids. It is possible with protein combinations of two incomplete protein sources (e.g., rice and beans) to make a complete protein source, and characteristic combinations are the basis of distinct cultural cooking traditions. However, complementary sources of protein do not need to be eaten at the same meal to be used together by the body. Excess amino acids from protein can be converted into glucose and used for fuel through a process called gluconeogenesis.

There is an ongoing debate about the differences in nutritional quality and adequacy of protein from vegan, vegetarian and animal sources, though many studies and institutions have found that a well-planned vegan or vegetarian diet contains enough high-quality protein to support the protein requirements of both sedentary and active people at all stages of life.

=== Water ===
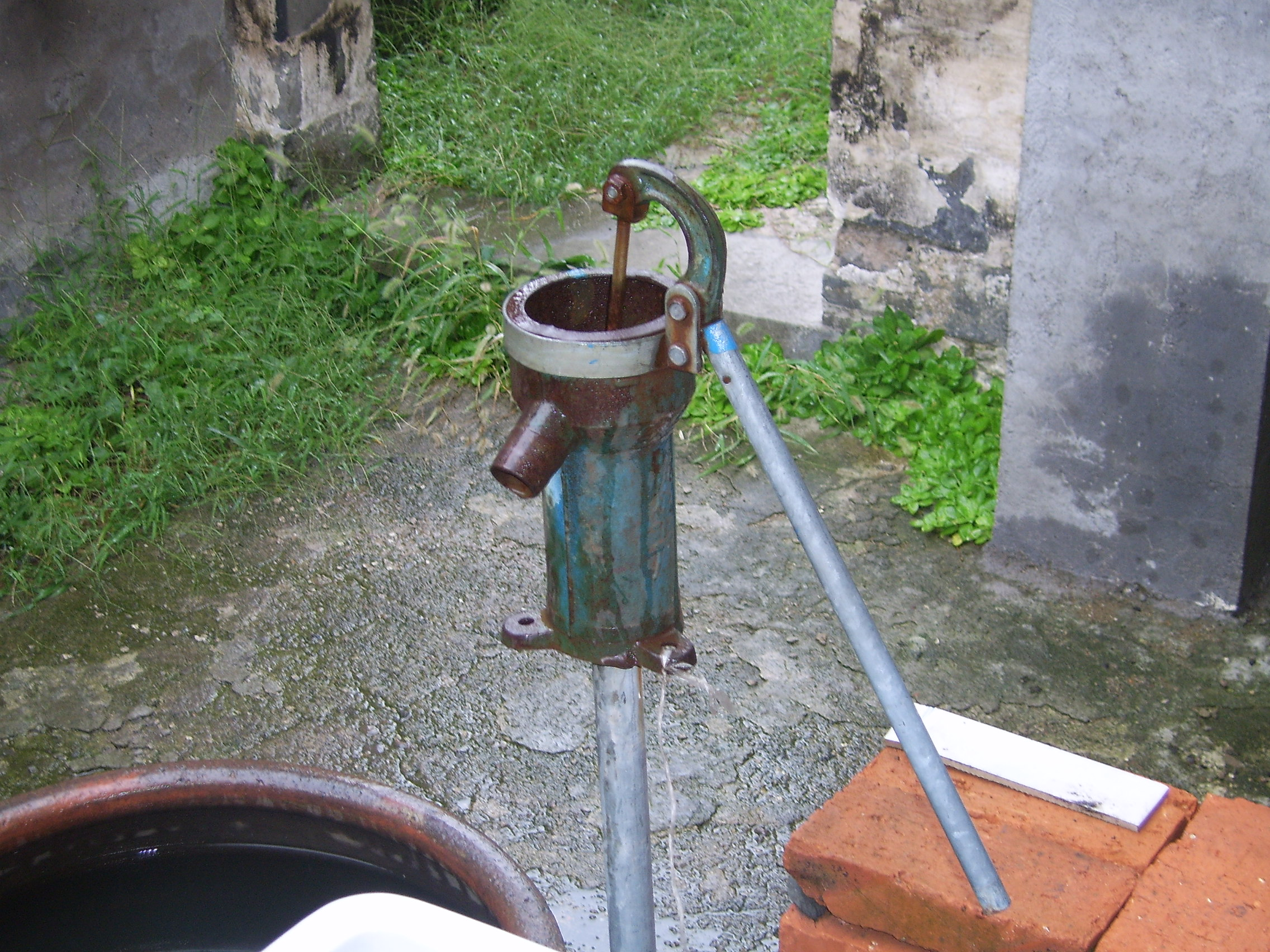
A manual water pump in China

Water is excreted from the body in multiple forms, including urine and feces, sweating, and by water vapour in the exhaled breath. Therefore, it is necessary to adequately rehydrate to replace lost fluids.

Early recommendations for the quantity of water required for maintenance of good health suggested that six to eight glasses of water daily is the minimum to maintain proper hydration. However, the notion that a person should consume eight glasses of water per day cannot be traced to a credible scientific source. The original water intake recommendation in 1945 by the Food and Nutrition Board of the National Research Council read: "An ordinary standard for diverse persons is 1 milliliter for each calorie of food. Most of this quantity is contained in prepared foods." More recent comparisons of well-known recommendations on fluid intake have revealed large discrepancies in the volumes of water we need to consume for good health. Therefore, to help standardize guidelines, recommendations for water consumption are included in two recent European Food Safety Authority (EFSA) documents (2010): (i) Food-based dietary guidelines and (ii) Dietary reference values for water or adequate daily intakes (ADI). These specifications were provided by calculating adequate intakes from measured intakes in populations of individuals with "desirable osmolarity values of urine and desirable water volumes per energy unit consumed".

For healthful hydration, the current EFSA guidelines recommend total water intakes of 2.0 L/day for adult females and 2.5 L/day for adult males. These reference values include water from drinking water, other beverages, and from food. About 80% of our daily water requirement comes from the beverages we drink, with the remaining 20% coming from food. Water content varies depending on the type of food consumed, with fruit and vegetables containing more than cereals, for example. These values are estimated using country-specific food balance sheets published by the Food and Agriculture Organisation of the United Nations.

The EFSA panel also determined intakes for different populations. Recommended intake volumes in the elderly are the same as for adults as despite lower energy consumption, the water requirement of this group is increased due to a reduction in renal concentrating capacity. Pregnant and breastfeeding women require additional fluids to stay hydrated. The EFSA panel proposes that pregnant women should consume the same volume of water as non-pregnant women, plus an increase in proportion to the higher energy requirement, equal to 300 mL/day. To compensate for additional fluid output, breastfeeding women require an additional 700 mL/day above the recommended intake values for non-lactating women. Dehydration and over-hydration – too little and too much water, respectively – can have harmful consequences. Drinking too much water is one of the possible causes of hyponatremia, i.e., low serum sodium.

=== Minerals ===
Essential elements for higher organisms (eucarya).
H																	He
Li	Be											B	C	N	O	F	Ne
Na	Mg											Al	Si	P	S	Cl	Ar
K	Ca	Sc	Ti	V	Cr	Mn	Fe	Co	Ni	Cu	Zn	Ga	Ge	As	Se	Br	Kr
Rb	Sr	Y	Zr	Nb	Mo	Tc	Ru	Rh	Pd	Ag	Cd	In	Sn	Sb	Te	I	Xe
Cs	Ba	Lu	Hf	Ta	W	Re	Os	Ir	Pt	Au	Hg	Tl	Pb	Bi	Po	At	Rn

Legend:
The four basic organic elements
Quantity elements
Essential trace elements
Essentiality or function debated
Not essential in humans, but essential/beneficial for some non-human eucarya

Dietary minerals are inorganic chemical elements required by living organisms, other than the four elements carbon, hydrogen, nitrogen, and oxygen that are present in nearly all organic molecules. Some have roles as cofactors, while others are electrolytes. The term "mineral" is archaic, since the intent is to describe simply the less common elements in the diet. Some are heavier than the four just mentioned – including several metals, which often occur as ions in the body. Some dietitians recommend that these be supplied from foods in which they occur naturally, or at least as complex compounds, or sometimes even from natural inorganic sources (such as calcium carbonate from ground oyster shells). Some are absorbed much more readily in the ionic forms found in such sources. On the other hand, minerals are often artificially added to the diet as supplements; the most well-known is likely iodine in iodized salt which prevents goiter.

==== Macrominerals ====
Elements with recommended dietary allowance (RDA) greater than 150 mg/day are, in alphabetical order:

- Calcium (Ca^{2+}) is vital to the health of the muscular, circulatory, and digestive systems; is indispensable to the building of bone; and supports the synthesis and function of blood cells. For example, calcium is used to regulate the contraction of muscles, nerve conduction, and the clotting of blood. It can play this role because the Ca^{2+} ion forms stable coordination complexes with many organic compounds, especially proteins; it also forms compounds with a wide range of solubility, enabling the formation of the skeleton. Food sources include yogurt, milk, cheese, leafy greens, tofu, and fortified beverages.
- Chlorine as chloride ions; electrolyte; see sodium, below.
- Magnesium, required for processing ATP and related reactions (builds bone, causes strong peristalsis, increases flexibility, increases alkalinity). Approximately 50% is in bone, the remaining 50% is almost all inside body cells, with only about 1% located in extracellular fluid. Food sources include oats, buckwheat, tofu, nuts, caviar, green leafy vegetables, legumes, and chocolate.
- Phosphorus, required component of bones; essential for energy processing. Approximately 80% is found in the inorganic portion of bones and teeth. Phosphorus is a component of every cell, as well as important metabolites, including DNA, RNA, ATP, and phospholipids. Also important in pH regulation. It is an important electrolyte in the form of phosphate. Food sources include cheese, egg yolk, milk, meat, fish, poultry, whole-grain cereals, and many others.
- Potassium, an electrolyte (heart and nerve function). With sodium, potassium is involved in maintaining normal water balance, osmotic equilibrium, and acid-base balance. In addition to calcium, it is important in the regulation of neuromuscular activity. Food sources include bananas, avocados, nuts, vegetables, potatoes, legumes, fish, and mushrooms.
- Sodium, a common food ingredient and electrolyte, found in most foods and manufactured consumer products, typically as sodium chloride (salt). Excessive sodium consumption can deplete calcium and magnesium. Sodium has a role in the etiology of hypertension demonstrated from studies showing that a reduction of table salt intake may reduce blood pressure.

==== Trace minerals ====
Many elements are required in smaller amounts (microgram quantities), usually because they play a catalytic role in enzymes. Some trace mineral elements (RDA < 200 mg/day) are, in alphabetical order:

- Cobalt as a component of the vitamin B_{12} family of coenzymes
- Copper required component of many redox enzymes, including cytochrome c oxidase (see Copper in health)
- Chromium required for sugar metabolism
- Iodine required not only for the biosynthesis of thyroxin, but probably, for other important organs as breast, stomach, salivary glands, thymus etc. (see Iodine deficiency); for this reason iodine is needed in larger quantities than others in this list, and sometimes classified with the macrominerals; Nowadays it is most easily found in iodized salt, but there are also natural sources such as Kombu.
- Iron required for many enzymes, and for hemoglobin and some other proteins
- Manganese (processing of oxygen)
- Molybdenum required for xanthine oxidase and related oxidases
- Selenium required for peroxidase (antioxidant proteins)
- Zinc required for several enzymes such as carboxypeptidase, liver alcohol dehydrogenase, carbonic anhydrase

==== Ultratrace minerals ====
Ultratrace minerals are an as yet unproven aspect of human nutrition, and may be required at amounts measured in very low ranges of μg/day. Many ultratrace elements have been suggested as essential, but such claims have usually not been confirmed. Definitive evidence for efficacy comes from the characterization of a biomolecule containing the element with an identifiable and testable function. These include:

- Bromine
- Arsenic
- Nickel
- Fluorine
- Boron
- Lithium
- Strontium
- Silicon
- Vanadium

=== Vitamins ===
Except for vitamin D, vitamins are essential nutrients, necessary in the diet for good health. Vitamin D can be synthesized in the skin in the presence of UVB radiation. (Many animal species can synthesize vitamin C, but humans cannot.) Certain vitamin-like compounds that are recommended in the diet, such as carnitine, are thought useful for survival and health, but these are not "essential" dietary nutrients because the human body has some capacity to produce them from other compounds. Moreover, thousands of different phytochemicals have recently been discovered in food (particularly in fresh vegetables), which may have desirable properties including antioxidant activity (see below); experimental demonstration has been suggestive but inconclusive. Other essential nutrients not classed as vitamins include essential amino acids (see above), essential fatty acids (see above), and the minerals discussed in the preceding section.

Vitamin deficiencies may result in disease conditions: goiter, scurvy, osteoporosis, impaired immune system, disorders of cell metabolism, certain forms of cancer, symptoms of premature aging, and poor psychological health (including eating disorders), among many others.

Excess levels of some vitamins are also dangerous to health. The Food and Nutrition Board of the Institute of Medicine has established Tolerable Upper Intake Levels (ULs) for seven vitamins.

== Malnutrition ==
The term malnutrition addresses 3 broad groups of conditions:

- Undernutrition, which includes wasting (low weight-for-height), stunting (low height-for-age) and underweight (low weight-for-age)
- Micronutrient-related malnutrition, which includes micronutrient deficiencies or insufficiencies (a lack of important vitamins and minerals) or micronutrient excess
- Overweight, obesity and diet-related noncommunicable diseases (such as heart disease, stroke, diabetes and some cancers).

In developed countries, the diseases of malnutrition are most often associated with nutritional imbalances or excessive consumption; there are more people in the world who are malnourished due to excessive consumption. According to the United Nations World Health Organization, the greatest challenge in developing nations today is not starvation, but insufficient nutrition – the lack of nutrients necessary for the growth and maintenance of vital functions. The causes of malnutrition are directly linked to inadequate macronutrient consumption and disease, and are indirectly linked to factors like "household food security, maternal and child care, health services, and the environment".

=== Insufficient ===
The U.S. Food and Nutrition Board sets Estimated Average Requirements (EARs) and Recommended Dietary Allowances (RDAs) for vitamins and minerals. EARs and RDAs are part of Dietary Reference Intakes. The DRI documents describe nutrient deficiency signs and symptoms.

=== Excessive ===
The U.S. Food and Nutrition Board sets Tolerable Upper Intake Levels (known as ULs) for vitamins and minerals when evidence is sufficient. ULs are set a safe fraction below amounts shown to cause health problems. ULs are part of Dietary Reference Intakes. The European Food Safety Authority also reviews the same safety questions and set its own ULs.

=== Unbalanced ===
When too much of one or more nutrients is present in the diet to the exclusion of the proper amount of other nutrients, the diet is said to be unbalanced. High calorie food ingredients such as vegetable oils, sugar and alcohol are referred to as "empty calories" because they displace from the diet foods that also contain protein, vitamins, minerals and fiber.

=== Illnesses caused by underconsumption and overconsumption ===
Nutrients	Deficiency	Excess
Macronutrients
Food energy	Starvation, marasmus	Obesity, diabetes mellitus, cardiovascular disease
Simple carbohydrates	None	Obesity, diabetes mellitus, cardiovascular disease
Complex carbohydrates	None	Obesity, cardiovascular disease (high glycemic index foods)
Protein	Kwashiorkor	Protein poisoning
Saturated fat	Low testosterone levels, vitamin deficiencies	Obesity, cardiovascular disease
Trans fat	None	Obesity, cardiovascular disease
Unsaturated fat	Fat-soluble vitamin deficiency	Obesity, cardiovascular disease
Micronutrients
Vitamin A	Xerophthalmia, night blindness, and low testosterone levels	Hypervitaminosis A (cirrhosis, hair loss)
Vitamin B_{1}	Beri-Beri	
Vitamin B_{2}	Skin and corneal lesions, cracking of skin and corneal unclearation	
Niacin	Pellagra	Dyspepsia, cardiac arrhythmias, birth defects
Biotin	Biotin deficiency	Reproductive and teratogenic effects
Folate	Anemia	Masks B_{12} deficiency, which can lead to permanent neurological damage
Vitamin B_{12}	Pernicious anemia, nerve cell damage	
Vitamin C	Scurvy	Diarrhea causing dehydration
Vitamin D	Rickets, osteomalacia	Hypervitaminosis D (dehydration, vomiting, constipation)
Vitamin E	Neurological disease	Hypervitaminosis E (anticoagulant: excessive bleeding)
Vitamin K	Hemorrhage	
Omega-3 fats	Cardiovascular disease	Bleeding, hemorrhages, hemorrhagic stroke, reduced glycemic control among diabetics
Omega-6 fats	None	Cardiovascular disease, Cancer
Cholesterol		Cardiovascular disease: atherosclerotic plaques, heart attack, stroke
Macrominerals
Calcium	Osteoporosis, tetany, carpopedal spasm, laryngospasm, cardiac arrhythmias	Fatigue, depression, confusion, nausea, vomiting, constipation, pancreatitis, increased urination, kidney stones, anorexia
Magnesium	Hypertension	Weakness, nausea, vomiting, impaired breathing, and hypotension
Potassium	Hypokalemia, cardiac arrhythmias	Hyperkalemia, palpitations
Sodium	Hyponatremia	Hypernatremia, hypertension
Trace minerals
Iron	Anemia	Cirrhosis, hereditary hemochromatosis, heart disease, cardiovascular disease
Iodine	Goiter, hypothyroidism	Iodine toxicity (goiter, hypothyroidism)

== Other substances ==
=== Alcohol (ethanol) ===
Pure ethanol provides 7 calories per gram. For distilled spirits, a standard serving in the United States is 1.5 fluid ounces, which at 40% ethanol (80 proof), would be 14 grams and 98 calories. Wine and beer contain a similar range of ethanol for servings of 5 ounces and 12 ounces, respectively, but these beverages also contain non-ethanol calories. A 5-ounce serving of wine contains 100 to 130 calories. A 12-ounce serving of beer contains 95 to 200 calories. According to the U.S. Department of Agriculture, based on NHANES 2013–2014 surveys, women ages 20 and up consume on average 6.8 grams/day and men consume on average 15.5 grams/day. Ignoring the non-alcohol contribution of those beverages, the average ethanol calorie contributions are 48 and 108 cal/day. Alcoholic beverages are considered empty calorie foods because other than calories, these contribute no essential nutrients.

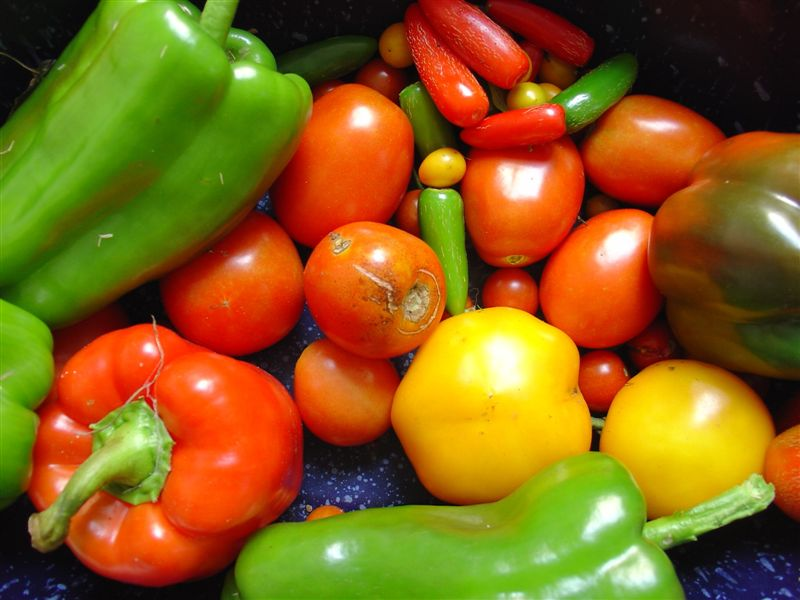
Colorful fruits and vegetables contribute vitamin A precursors to the diet

=== Non-nutrient phytochemicals ===
Phytochemicals, such as polyphenols, are compounds produced naturally in plants (phyto means "plant" in Greek), and are present in variable amounts in plant foods. The phytochemical term typically refers to plant compounds that are not proven to be nutrients – as are carbohydrates, proteins, vitamins, and dietary minerals – but rather identifies plant compounds that are not essential for human nutrition. While there is ample evidence to show that diets rich in colorful fruits and vegetables, legumes, and whole grains are nutritious, the role of most phytochemicals in contributing to human nutrition is unknown. Exceptions are select carotenoids, such as beta-carotene and beta-cryptoxanthin – pigments giving red, orange, and yellow colors to plant foods – which are converted to vitamin A in the body.

There is no conclusive evidence in humans that polyphenols or other non-carotenoid phytochemicals contribute to nutrition, mainly because these compounds have poor bioavailability, i.e., following ingestion, they are extensively digested into smaller metabolites with unknown functions, then are rapidly eliminated from the body.

== Intestinal microbiome ==
The intestines contain a large population of gut flora. In humans, the four dominant phyla are Bacillota, Bacteroidota, Actinomycetota, and Pseudomonadota. They are essential to digestion and are also affected by food that is consumed. Bacteria are essential for metabolizing food substrates and thereby increasing energy output, and produce a great variety of metabolites, including vitamins and short-chain fatty acids that contribute to the metabolism in a wide variety of ways. These metabolites are responsible for stimulating cell growth, repressing the growth of harmful bacteria, priming the immune system to respond only to pathogens, helping to maintain a healthy gut barrier, control gene expression by epigenetic regulation and defending against some infectious diseases.

== Global nutrition challenges ==
The challenges facing global nutrition are disease, child malnutrition, obesity, and vitamin deficiency.

=== Disease ===
The most common non-infectious diseases worldwide, that contribute most to the global mortality rate, are cardiovascular diseases, various cancers, diabetes, and chronic respiratory problems, all of which are linked to poor nutrition. Nutrition and diet are closely associated with the leading causes of death, including cardiovascular disease and cancer. Obesity and high sodium intake can contribute to ischemic heart disease, while consumption of fruits and vegetables can decrease the risk of developing cancer.

Food-borne and infectious diseases can result in malnutrition, and malnutrition exacerbates infectious disease. Poor nutrition leaves children and adults more susceptible to contracting life-threatening diseases such as diarrheal infections and respiratory infections. According to the WHO, in 2011, 6.9 million children died of infectious diseases like pneumonia, diarrhea, malaria, and neonatal conditions, of which at least one third were associated with undernutrition.

=== Child malnutrition ===
According to UNICEF, in 2011, 101 million children across the globe were underweight and one in four children, 165 million, were stunted in growth. Simultaneously, there are 43 million children under five who are overweight or obese. Nearly 20 million children under five suffer from severe acute malnutrition, a life-threatening condition requiring urgent treatment. According to estimations at UNICEF, hunger will be responsible for 5.6 million deaths of children under the age of five this year. These all represent significant public health emergencies. This is because proper maternal and child nutrition has immense consequences for survival, acute and chronic disease incidence, normal growth, and economic productivity of individuals.

Childhood malnutrition is common and contributes to the global burden of disease. Childhood is a particularly important time to achieve good nutrition status, because poor nutrition has the capability to lock a child in a vicious cycle of disease susceptibility and recurring sickness, which threatens cognitive and social development. Undernutrition and bias in access to food and health services leaves children less likely to attend or perform well in school.

=== Undernutrition ===
UNICEF defines undernutrition "as the outcome of insufficient food intake (hunger) and repeated infectious diseases. Undernutrition includes being underweight for one's age, too short for one's age (stunted growth), dangerously thin (muscle wasting), and deficient in vitamins and minerals (micronutrient malnutrition). Under nutrition causes 53% of deaths of children under five across the world. It has been estimated that undernutrition is the underlying cause for 35% of child deaths. The Maternal and Child Nutrition Study Group estimate that under nutrition, "including fetal growth restriction, stunting, wasting, deficiencies of vitamin A and zinc along with suboptimum breastfeeding—is a cause of 3.1 million child deaths and infant mortality, or 45% of all child deaths in 2011".

When humans are undernourished, they no longer maintain normal bodily functions, such as growth, resistance to infection, or have insufficient drive for every everyday tasks and unsatisfactory performance in school or work. Major causes of under nutrition in young children include lack of proper breast feeding for infants and illnesses such as diarrhea, pneumonia, malaria, and HIV/AIDS. According to UNICEF 146 million children across the globe, that one out of four under the age of five, are underweight. The number of underweight children has decreased since 1990, from 33 percent to 28 percent between 1990 and 2004. Underweight and stunted children are more susceptible to infection, more likely to fall behind in academics and develop non-infectious diseases, ultimately affecting their livelihood. Therefore, undernutrition can result in an accumulation of afflictions and health deficiencies which results in less productivity individually and as a community.

Many children are born with the inherent disadvantage of low birth weight, often caused by intrauterine growth restriction and poor maternal nutrition, which results in affected growth, development and health throughout the course of their lifetime. Children born at low birth weight (less than 5.5 pounds or 2.5 kg), are less likely to be healthy and are more susceptible to disease and early death. Those born at low birth weight also are likely to have a depressed immune system, which can increase their chances of heart disease and diabetes later on in life. Because 96% of low birth weight occurs in the developing world, low birth weight has been associated with childbirth in impoverished areas where the birth mother typically exhibits poor nutritional status under harsh and demanding living conditions.

Stunting and other forms of undernutrition reduces a child's chance of survival and hinders their optimal growth and health. Stunting has demonstrated association with poor brain development, which reduces cognitive ability, academic performance and future earning potential. Important determinants of stunting include the quality and frequency of infant and child feeding, infectious disease susceptibility, and the mother's nutrition and health status. Undernourished mothers are more likely to birth stunted children, perpetuating a cycle of undernutrition and poverty. Stunted children are more likely to develop obesity and chronic diseases upon reaching adulthood. Therefore, malnutrition resulting in stunting can further worsen the obesity epidemic, especially in low and middle income countries. This creates even new economic and social challenges for vulnerable impoverished groups.

Data on global and regional food supply shows that consumption rose from 2011 to 2012 in all regions. Diets became more diverse, with a decrease in consumption of cereals and roots and an increase in fruits, vegetables, and meat products. However, this increase masks the discrepancies between nations, where Africa, in particular, saw a decrease in food consumption over the same years. This information is derived from food balance sheets that reflect national food supplies, however, this does not necessarily reflect the distribution of micronutrients and macronutrients. Often inequality in food access leaves distribution which uneven, resulting in undernourishment for some and obesity for others.

Undernourishment, or hunger, according to the Food and Agriculture Organization (FAO), is dietary intake below the minimum daily energy requirement. The amount of undernourishment is calculated utilizing the average amount of food available for consumption, the size of the population, the relative disparities in access to the food, and the minimum calories required for each individual. According to FAO, 868 million people (12% of the global population) were undernourished in 2012. This has decreased across the world since 1990, in all regions except for Africa, where undernourishment has steadily increased. However, the rates of decrease are not sufficient to meet the first Millennium Development Goal of halving hunger between 1990 and 2015. The global financial, economic, and food price crisis in 2008 drove many people to hunger, especially women and children. The spike in food prices prevented many people from escaping poverty, because the poor spend a larger proportion of their income on food and farmers are net consumers of food. High food prices cause consumers to have less purchasing power and to substitute more-nutritious foods with low-cost alternatives.

=== Adult overweight and obesity ===
Malnutrition in Industrialized nations is primarily due to non-nutritious carbohydrates sources resulting in excess caloric intake, which has contributed to the obesity epidemic affecting both developed and certain developing nations. In 2008, 35% of adults above the age of 20 years were overweight (BMI ≥ 25 kg/m^{2}), a prevalence that has doubled worldwide between 1980 and 2008. Also 10% of men and 14% of women were obese, with a body mass index (BMI) greater than 30. Rates of overweight and obesity vary across the globe, with the highest prevalence in the Americas, followed by European nations, where over 50% of the population is overweight or obese.

Obesity is more prevalent among upper-middle to high income groups compared to lower income divisions. Women are more likely than men to be obese, where the rate of obesity in women doubled from 8% to 14% between 1980 and 2008. Being overweight as a child has become an increasingly important statistic as an indicator for later development of obesity and non-infectious diseases such as cardiovascular disease. In several western European nations, the prevalence of overweight and obese children rose by 10% from 1980 to 1990, a rate that has begun to accelerate recently.

=== Vitamin and mineral malnutrition ===
Vitamins and minerals are essential to the proper functioning and maintenance of the human body. There are 20 trace elements and minerals that are essential in small quantities to body function and overall human health.

Iron deficiency is the most common inadequate nutrient worldwide, affecting approximately 2 billion people. Globally, anemia affects 1.6 billion people, and represents a public health emergency in mothers and children under five. The World Health Organization estimates that there exists 469 million women of reproductive age and approximately 600 million preschool and school-age children worldwide who are anemic. Anemia, especially iron-deficient anemia, is a critical problem for cognitive developments in children, and its presence leads to maternal deaths and poor brain and motor development in children. The development of anemia affects mothers and children more because infants and children have higher iron requirements for growth. Health consequences for iron deficiency in young children include increased perinatal mortality, delayed mental and physical development, negative behavioral consequences, reduced auditory and visual function, and impaired physical performance. The harm caused by iron deficiency during child development cannot be reversed and result in reduced academic performance, poor physical work capacity, and decreased productivity in adulthood. Mothers are also very susceptible to iron-deficient anemia because women lose iron during menstruation, and rarely supplement it in their diet. Maternal iron deficiency anemia increases the chances of maternal mortality, contributing to at least 18% of maternal deaths in low and middle income countries.

Vitamin A plays an essential role in developing the immune system in children, therefore, it is considered an essential micronutrient that can greatly affect health. However, because of the expense of testing for deficiencies, many developing nations have not been able to fully detect and address vitamin A deficiency, leaving vitamin A deficiency considered a silent hunger. According to estimates, subclinical vitamin A deficiency, characterized by low retinol levels, affects 190 million pre-school children and 19 million mothers worldwide.

The WHO estimates that 5.2 million of these children under five are affected by night blindness, which is considered clinical vitamin A deficiency. Severe vitamin A deficiency (VAD) for developing children can result in visual impairments, anemia and weakened immunity, and increase their risk of morbidity and mortality from infectious disease. This also presents a problem for women, with WHO estimating that 9.8 million women are affected by night blindness. Clinical vitamin A deficiency is particularly common among pregnant women, with prevalence rates as high as 9.8% in South-East Asia.

Estimates say that 28.5% of the global population is iodine deficient, representing 1.88 billion individuals. Although salt iodization programs have reduced the prevalence of iodine deficiency, this is still a public health concern in 32 nations. Moderate deficiencies are common in Europe and Africa, and over consumption is common in the Americas. Iodine-deficient diets can interfere with adequate thyroid hormone production, which is responsible for normal growth in the brain and nervous system. This ultimately leads to poor school performance and impaired intellectual capabilities.

=== Infant and young child feeding ===
Improvement of breast feeding practices, like early initiation and exclusive breast feeding for the first two years of life, could save the lives of 1.5 million children annually. Nutrition interventions targeted at infants aged 0–5 months first encourages early initiation of breastfeeding. Though the relationship between early initiation of breast feeding and improved health outcomes has not been formally established, a recent study in Ghana suggests a causal relationship between early initiation and reduced infection-caused neo-natal deaths. Also, experts promote exclusive breastfeeding, rather than using formula, which has shown to promote optimal growth, development, and health of infants. Exclusive breastfeeding often indicates nutritional status because infants that consume breast milk are more likely to receive all adequate nourishment and nutrients that will aid their developing body and immune system. This leaves children less likely to contract diarrheal diseases and respiratory infections.

Besides the quality and frequency of breastfeeding, the nutritional status of mothers affects infant health. When mothers do not receive proper nutrition, it threatens the wellness and potential of their children. Well-nourished women are less likely to experience risks of birth and are more likely to deliver children who will develop well physically and mentally. Maternal undernutrition increases the chances of low-birth weight, which can increase the risk of infections and asphyxia in fetuses, increasing the probability of neonatal deaths. Growth failure during intrauterine conditions, associated with improper mother nutrition, can contribute to lifelong health complications. Approximately 13 million children are born with intrauterine growth restriction annually.

=== Anorexia nervosa ===
Anorexia nervosa stands out as the psychiatric disorder with the highest mortality rate. It affects approximately 0.3% of young women and is especially common among teenage girls, with the average onset at around 15 years old. The disorder predominantly impacts females, with 80-90% of those diagnosed being women. Anorexia is the leading cause of significant weight loss in young women and is the primary reason for their admission to child and adolescent hospital services. In most cases, a clear diagnosis of weight loss driven by psychological factors can be made without resorting to a series of complex tests. Basic medical evaluations, including blood tests, electrocardiograms, and tracking the patient's weight and measurements, not only help in identifying underlying issues but also provide a reason for the patient to return for follow-up discussions. These follow-ups can often reveal psychological challenges. When weight loss is hidden, symptoms such as depression, obsessive behaviors, infertility, or amenorrhea may be the first signs that there is cause for concern. Although relatively uncommon, eating disorders can negatively affect menstruation, fertility, and maternal and fetal well-being. Among infertile women with amenorrhea or oligomenorrhea due to eating disorders, 58% had menstrual irregularities, according to preliminary research in 1990. Recent research has shown no significant difference in fertility between women with a history of anorexia nervosa and those without, suggesting that despite experiencing high rates of menstrual irregularities, women with anorexia nervosa are still achieving pregnancy.

=== Nutrition literacy ===
The findings of the 2003 National Assessment of Adult Literacy (NAAL), conducted by the US Department of Education, provide a basis upon which to frame the nutrition literacy problem in the U.S. NAAL introduced the first-ever measure of "the degree to which individuals have the capacity to obtain, process and understand basic health information and services needed to make appropriate health decisions" – an objective of Healthy People 2010 and of which nutrition literacy might be considered an important subset. On a scale of below basic, basic, intermediate and proficient, NAAL found 13 percent of adult Americans have proficient health literacy, 44% have intermediate literacy, 29 percent have basic literacy and 14 percent have below basic health literacy. The study found that health literacy increases with education and people living below the level of poverty have lower health literacy than those above it.

Another study examining the health and nutrition literacy status of residents of the lower Mississippi Delta found that 52 percent of participants had a high likelihood of limited literacy skills. While a precise comparison between the NAAL and Delta studies is difficult, primarily because of methodological differences, Zoellner et al. suggest that health literacy rates in the Mississippi Delta region are different from the U.S. general population and that they help establish the scope of the problem of health literacy among adults in the Delta region. For example, only 12 percent of study participants identified the MyPyramid graphic two years after it had been launched by the United States Department of Agriculture (USDA). The study also found significant relationships between nutrition literacy and income level and nutrition literacy and educational attainment further delineating priorities for the region.

These statistics point to the complexities surrounding the lack of health/nutrition literacy and reveal the degree to which they are embedded in the social structure and interconnected with other problems. Among these problems are the lack of information about food choices, a lack of understanding of nutritional information and its application to individual circumstances, limited or difficult access to healthful foods, and a range of cultural influences and socioeconomic constraints such as low levels of education and high levels of poverty that decrease opportunities for healthful eating and living.

The links between low health literacy and poor health outcomes has been widely documented and there is evidence that some interventions to improve health literacy have produced successful results in the primary care setting. More must be done to further our understanding of nutrition literacy specific interventions in non-primary care settings in order to achieve better health outcomes.

== International food insecurity and malnutrition ==
According to UNICEF, South Asia has the highest levels of underweight children under five, followed by sub-Saharan Africans nations, with Industrialized countries and Latin nations having the lowest rates.

=== Industrialized countries ===
According to UNICEF, the Commonwealth of Independent States has the lowest rates of stunting and wasting, at 14 percent and 3 percent. The nations of Estonia, Finland, Iceland, Lithuania and Sweden have the lowest prevalence of low birthweight children in the world- at 4%. Proper prenatal nutrition is responsible for this small prevalence of low birthweight infants. However, low birthweight rates are increasing, due to the use of fertility drugs, resulting in multiple births, women bearing children at an older age, and the advancement of technology allowing more pre-term infants to survive. Industrialized nations more often face malnutrition in the form of over-nutrition from excess calories and non-nutritious carbohydrates, which has contributed greatly to the public health epidemic of obesity. Disparities, according to gender, geographic location and socio-economic position, both within and between countries, represent the biggest threat to child nutrition in industrialized countries. These disparities are a direct product of social inequalities and social inequalities are rising throughout the industrialized world, particularly in Europe.

=== North America ===
==== United States ====
In the United States, 2% of children are underweight, with under 1% stunted and 6% are wasting.

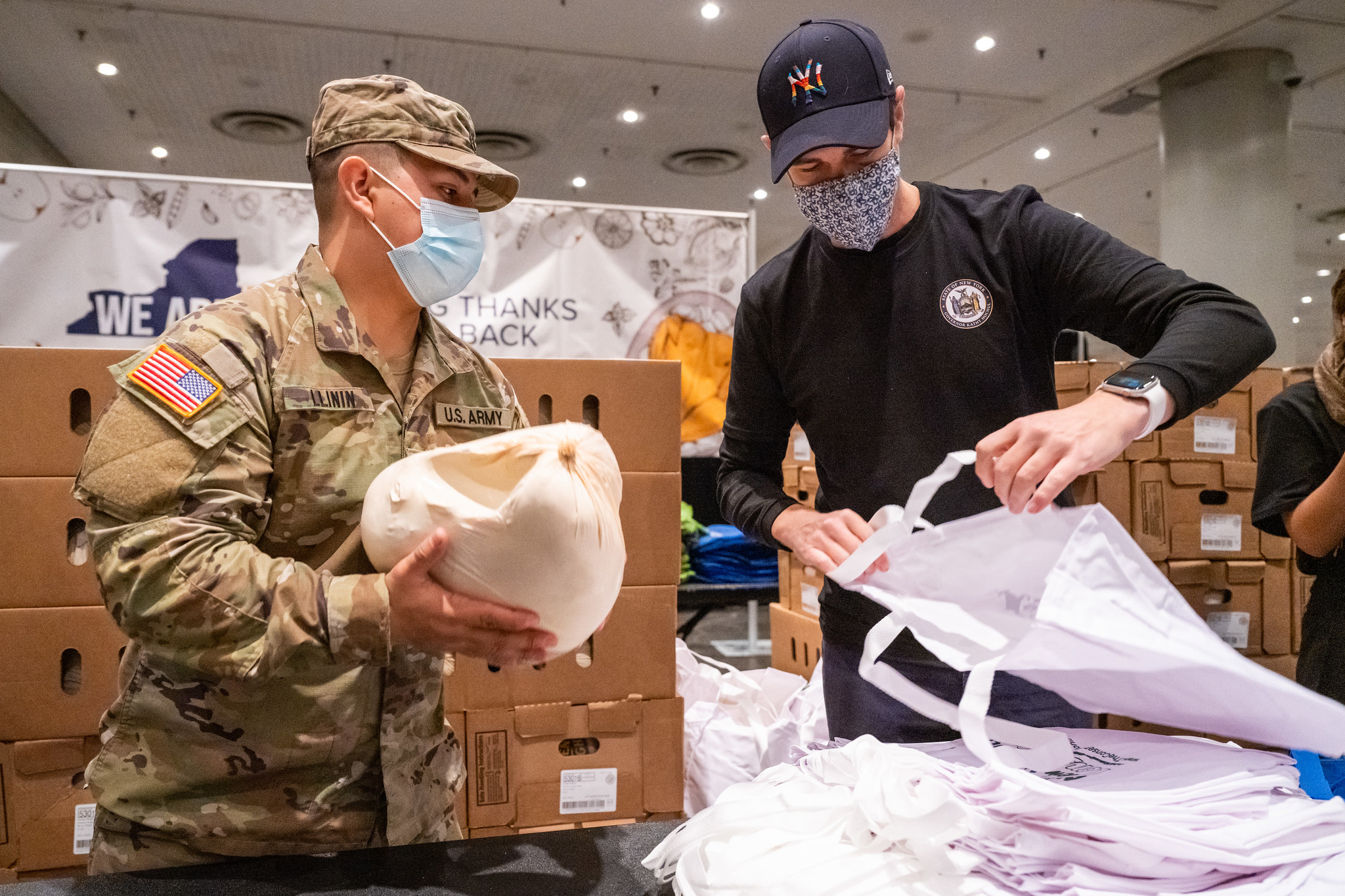
New York National Guard Assisting Volunteers packing turkeys for families facing food insecurity

Dietitians are registered dietitian nutritionists (RDN) with the Commission for Dietetic Registration and the Academy of Nutrition and Dietetics, and are only able to use the title "dietitian", as described by the business and professions codes of each respective state, when they have met specific educational and experiential prerequisites and passed a national registration or licensure examination, respectively. Anyone may call themselves a nutritionist, including unqualified dietitians, as this term is unregulated. Some states, such as the State of Florida, have begun to include the title "nutritionist" in state licensure requirements. Most governments provide guidance on nutrition, and some also impose mandatory disclosure/labeling requirements for processed food manufacturers and restaurants to assist consumers in complying with such guidance.

Nutritional standards and recommendations are established jointly by the US Department of Agriculture and US Department of Health and Human Services. Dietary and physical activity guidelines from the USDA are presented in the concept of a plate of food which in 2011 superseded the MyPyramid food pyramid that had replaced the Food Guide Pyramid. The United States Senate Committee on Agriculture, Nutrition, and Forestry is currently responsible for oversight of the USDA. The U.S. Department of Health and Human Services provides a sample week-long menu which fulfills the nutritional recommendations of the government.

==== Canada ====
Canada's Food Guide is an evidence-based education and policy tool provided by Health Canada that is designed to promote healthy eating.

=== South Asia ===
South Asia has the highest percentage and number of underweight children under five in the world, at approximately 78 million children. Patterns of stunting and wasting are similar, where 44% have not reached optimal height and 15% are wasted, rates much higher than any other regions. This region of the world has extremely high rates of underweight children. According to a 2006 UNICEF study, 46% of its child population under five is underweight. The same study indicates India, Bangladesh, and Pakistan combined account for half the globe's underweight child population. South Asian nations have made progress towards the MDGs, considering the rate has decreased from 53% since 1990, however, a 1.7% decrease of underweight prevalence per year will not be sufficient to meet the 2015 goal. Some nations, such as Afghanistan, Bangladesh, and Sri Lanka, on the other hand, have made significant improvements, all decreasing their prevalence by half in ten years. While India and Pakistan have made modest improvements, Nepal has made no significant improvement in underweight child prevalence. Other forms of undernutrition have continued to persist with high resistance to improvement, such as the prevalence of stunting and wasting, which has not changed significantly in the past 10 years. Causes of this poor nutrition include energy-insufficient diets, poor sanitation conditions, and the gender disparities in educational and social status. Girls and women face discrimination especially in nutrition status, where South Asia is the only region in the world where girls are more likely to be underweight than boys. In South Asia, 60% of children in the lowest quintile are underweight, compared to only 26% in the highest quintile, and the rate of reduction of underweight is slower amongst the poorest.

=== Eastern and Southern Africa ===
The Eastern and Southern African nations have shown no improvement since 1990 in the rate of underweight children under five. They have also made no progress in halving hunger by 2015, the most prevalent Millennium Development Goal. This is due primarily to the prevalence of famine, declined agricultural productivity, food emergencies, drought, conflict, and increased poverty. This, along with HIV/AIDS, has inhibited the nutrition development of nations such as Lesotho, Malawi, Mozambique, Swaziland, Zambia and Zimbabwe. Botswana has made remarkable achievements in reducing underweight prevalence, dropping 4% in 4 years, despite its place as the second leader in HIV prevalence amongst adults in the globe. South Africa, the wealthiest nation in this region, has the second-lowest proportion of underweight children at 12%, but has been steadily increasing in underweight prevalence since 1995. Almost half of Ethiopian children are underweight, and along with Nigeria, they account for almost one-third of the underweight under five in all of Sub-Saharan Africa.

=== West and Central Africa ===
West and Central Africa has the highest rate of children under five underweight in the world. Of the countries in this region, the Congo has the lowest rate at 14%, while the nations of Democratic Republic of the Congo, Ghana, Guinea, Mali, Nigeria, Senegal and Togo are improving slowly. In Gambia, rates decreased from 26% to 17% in four years, and their coverage of vitamin A supplementation reaches 91% of vulnerable populations. This region has the next highest proportion of wasted children, with 10% of the population under five not at optimal weight. Little improvement has been made between the years of 1990 and 2004 in reducing the rates of underweight children under five, whose rate stayed approximately the same. Sierra Leone has the highest child under five mortality rate in the world, due predominantly to its extreme infant mortality rate, at 238 deaths per 1000 live births. Other contributing factors include the high rate of low birthweight children (23%) and low levels of exclusive breast feeding (4%). Anemia is prevalent in these nations, with unacceptable rates of iron deficient anemia. The nutritional status of children is further indicated by its high (10%) rate of child wasting. Wasting is a significant problem in Sahelian countries – Burkina Faso, Chad, Mali, Mauritania and Niger – where rates fall between 11% and 19% of under fives, affecting more than 1 million children.

In Mali, the International Crops Research Institute for the Semi-Arid Tropics (ICRISAT) and the Aga Khan Foundation trained women's groups to make equinut, a healthy and nutritional version of the traditional recipe di-dèguè (comprising peanut paste, honey and millet or rice flour). The aim was to boost nutrition and livelihoods by producing a product that women could make and sell, and which would be accepted by the local community because of its local heritage.

=== Middle East and North Africa ===
Six countries in the Middle East and North Africa region are on target to meet goals for reducing underweight children by 2015, and 12 countries have prevalence rates below 10%. However, the nutrition of children in the region as a whole has degraded for the past ten years due to the increasing portion of underweight children in three populous nations – Iraq, Sudan, and Yemen. Forty six percent of all children in Yemen are underweight, a percentage that has worsened by 4% since 1990. In Yemen, 53% of children under five are stunted and 32% are born at low birth weight. Sudan has an underweight prevalence of 41%, and the highest proportion of wasted children in the region at 16%. One percent of households in Sudan consume iodized salt. Iraq has also seen an increase in child underweight since 1990. Djibouti, Jordan, the Occupied Palestinian Territory (OPT), Oman, the Syrian Arab Republic and Tunisia are all projected to meet minimum nutrition goals, with OPT, Syrian AR, and Tunisia the fastest improving regions. This region demonstrates that undernutrition does not always improve with economic prosperity, where the United Arab Emirates, for example, despite being a wealthy nation, has similar child death rates due to malnutrition to those seen in Yemen.

=== East Asia and the Pacific ===
The East Asia and Pacific region has reached its goals on nutrition, in part due to the improvements contributed by China, the region's most populous country. China has reduced its underweight prevalence from 19 percent to 8 percent between 1990 and 2002. China played the largest role in the world in decreasing the rate of children under five underweight between 1990 and 2004, halving the prevalence. This reduction of underweight prevalence has aided in the lowering of the under 5 mortality rate from 49 to 31 of 1000. They also have a low birthweight rate at 4%, a rate comparable to industrialized countries, and over 90% of households receive adequate iodized salts. However, large disparities exist between children in rural and urban areas, where 5 provinces in China leave 1.5 million children iodine deficient and susceptible to diseases. Singapore, Vietnam, Malaysia, and Indonesia are all projected to reach nutrition MDGs. Singapore has the lowest under five mortality rate of any nation, besides Iceland, in the world, at 3%. Cambodia has the highest rate of child mortality in the region (141 per 1,000 live births), while still its proportion of underweight children increased by 5 percent to 45% in 2000. Further nutrient indicators show that only 12 per cent of Cambodian babies are exclusively breastfed and only 14 per cent of households consume iodized salt.

=== Latin America and the Caribbean ===
This region has undergone the fastest progress in decreasing poor nutrition status of children in the world. The Latin American region has reduced underweight children prevalence by 3.8% every year between 1990 and 2004, with a current rate of 7% underweight. They also have the lowest rate of child mortality in the developing world, with only 31 per 1000 deaths, and the highest iodine consumption. Cuba has seen improvement from 9 to 4 percent underweight under 5 between 1996 and 2004. The prevalence has also decreased in the Dominican Republic, Jamaica, Peru, and Chile. Chile has a rate of underweight under 5, at merely 1%. The most populous nations, Brazil and Mexico, mostly have relatively low rates of underweight under 5, with only 6% and 8%. Guatemala has the highest percentage of underweight and stunted children in the region, with rates above 45%. There are disparities amongst different populations in this region. For example, children in rural areas have twice the prevalence of underweight at 13%, compared to urban areas at 5%.

== Nutrition access disparities ==
Occurring throughout the world, lack of proper nutrition is both a consequence and cause of poverty. Impoverished individuals are less likely to have access to nutritious food and to escape from poverty than those who have healthy diets. Disparities in socioeconomic status, both between and within nations, provide the largest threat to child nutrition in industrialized nations, where social inequality is on the rise. According to UNICEF, children living in the poorest households are twice as likely to be underweight as those in the richest. Those in the lowest wealth quintile and whose mothers have the least education demonstrate the highest rates of child mortality and stunting. Throughout the developing world, socioeconomic inequality in childhood malnutrition is more severe than in upper income brackets, regardless of the general rate of malnutrition. According to UNICEF, children in rural locations are more than twice as likely to be underweight as compared to children under five in urban areas. In Latin American/Caribbean nations, "Children living in rural areas in Bolivia, Honduras, Mexico and Nicaragua are more than twice as likely to be underweight as children living in urban areas. That likelihood doubles to four times in Peru." Concurrently, the greatest increase in childhood obesity has been seen in the lower middle income bracket.

In the United States, the incidence of low birthweight is on the rise among all populations, but particularly among minorities.

According to UNICEF, boys and girls have almost identical rates as underweight children under age 5 across the world, except in South Asia.

== Nutrition policy ==
=== Nutrition interventions ===
Nutrition directly influences progress towards meeting the Millennium Development Goals of eradicating hunger and poverty through health and education. Therefore, nutrition interventions take a multi-faceted approach to improve the nutrition status of various populations. Policy and programming must target both individual behavioral changes and policy approaches to public health. While most nutrition interventions focus on delivery through the health-sector, non-health sector interventions targeting agriculture, water and sanitation, and education are important as well. Global nutrition micronutrient deficiencies often receive large-scale solution approaches by deploying large governmental and non-governmental organizations. For example, in 1990, iodine deficiency was particularly prevalent, with one in five households, or 1.7 billion people, not consuming adequate iodine, leaving them at risk to develop associated diseases. Therefore, a global campaign to iodize salt to eliminate iodine deficiency successfully boosted the rate to 69% of households in the world consuming adequate amounts of iodine.

Emergencies and crises often exacerbate undernutrition, due to the aftermath of crises that include food insecurity, poor health resources, unhealthy environments, and poor healthcare practices. Therefore, the repercussions of natural disasters and other emergencies can exponentially increase the rates of macro and micronutrient deficiencies in populations. Disaster relief interventions often take a multi-faceted public health approach. UNICEF's programming targeting nutrition services amongst disaster settings include nutrition assessments, measles immunization, vitamin A supplementation, provision of fortified foods and micronutrient supplements, support for breastfeeding and complementary feeding for infants and young children, and therapeutic and supplementary feeding. For example, during Nigeria's food crisis of 2005, 300,000 children received therapeutic nutrition feeding programs through the collaboration of UNICEF, the Niger government, the World Food Programme, and 24 NGOs utilizing community and facility based feeding schemes.

Interventions aimed at pregnant women, infants, and children take a behavioral and program-based approach. Behavioral intervention objectives include promoting proper breast-feeding, the immediate initiation of breastfeeding, and its continuation through 2 years and beyond. UNICEF recognizes that to promote these behaviors, healthful environments must be established conducive to promoting these behaviors, like healthy hospital environments, skilled health workers, support in the public and workplace, and removing negative influences. Finally, other interventions include provisions of adequate micro and macro nutrients such as iron, anemia, and vitamin A supplements and vitamin-fortified foods and ready-to-use products. Programs addressing micronutrient deficiencies, such as those aimed at anemia, have attempted to provide iron supplementation to pregnant and lactating women. However, because supplementation often occurs too late, these programs have had little effect. Interventions such as women's nutrition, early and exclusive breastfeeding, appropriate complementary food and micronutrient supplementation have proven to reduce stunting and other manifestations of undernutrition. A Cochrane review of community-based maternal health packages showed that this community-based approach improved the initiation of breastfeeding within one hour of birth. Some programs have had adverse effects. One example is the "Formula for Oil" relief program in Iraq, which resulted in the replacement of breastfeeding for formula, which has negatively affected infant nutrition.

=== Implementation and delivery platforms ===
In April 2010, the World Bank and the IMF released a policy briefing entitled "Scaling up Nutrition (SUN): A Framework for action" that represented a partnered effort to address the Lancet's Series on under nutrition, and the goals it set out for improving under nutrition. They emphasized the 1000 days after birth as the prime window for effective nutrition intervention, encouraging programming that was cost-effective and showed significant cognitive improvement in populations, as well as enhanced productivity and economic growth. This document was labeled the SUN framework, and was launched by the UN General Assembly in 2010 as a road map encouraging the coherence of stakeholders like governments, academia, UN system organizations and foundations in working towards reducing under nutrition. The SUN framework has initiated a transformation in global nutrition- calling for country-based nutrition programs, increasing evidence based and cost–effective interventions, and "integrating nutrition within national strategies for gender equality, agriculture, food security, social protection, education, water supply, sanitation, and health care". Government often plays a role in implementing nutrition programs through policy. For instance, several East Asian nations have enacted legislation to increase iodization of salt to increase household consumption. Political commitment in the form of evidence-based effective national policies and programs, trained skilled community nutrition workers, and effective communication and advocacy can all work to decrease malnutrition. Market and industrial production can play a role as well. For example, in the Philippines, improved production and market availability of iodized salt increased household consumption. While most nutrition interventions are delivered directly through governments and health services, other sectors, such as agriculture, water and sanitation, and education, are vital for nutrition promotion as well.

== Advice and guidance ==
=== Government policies ===
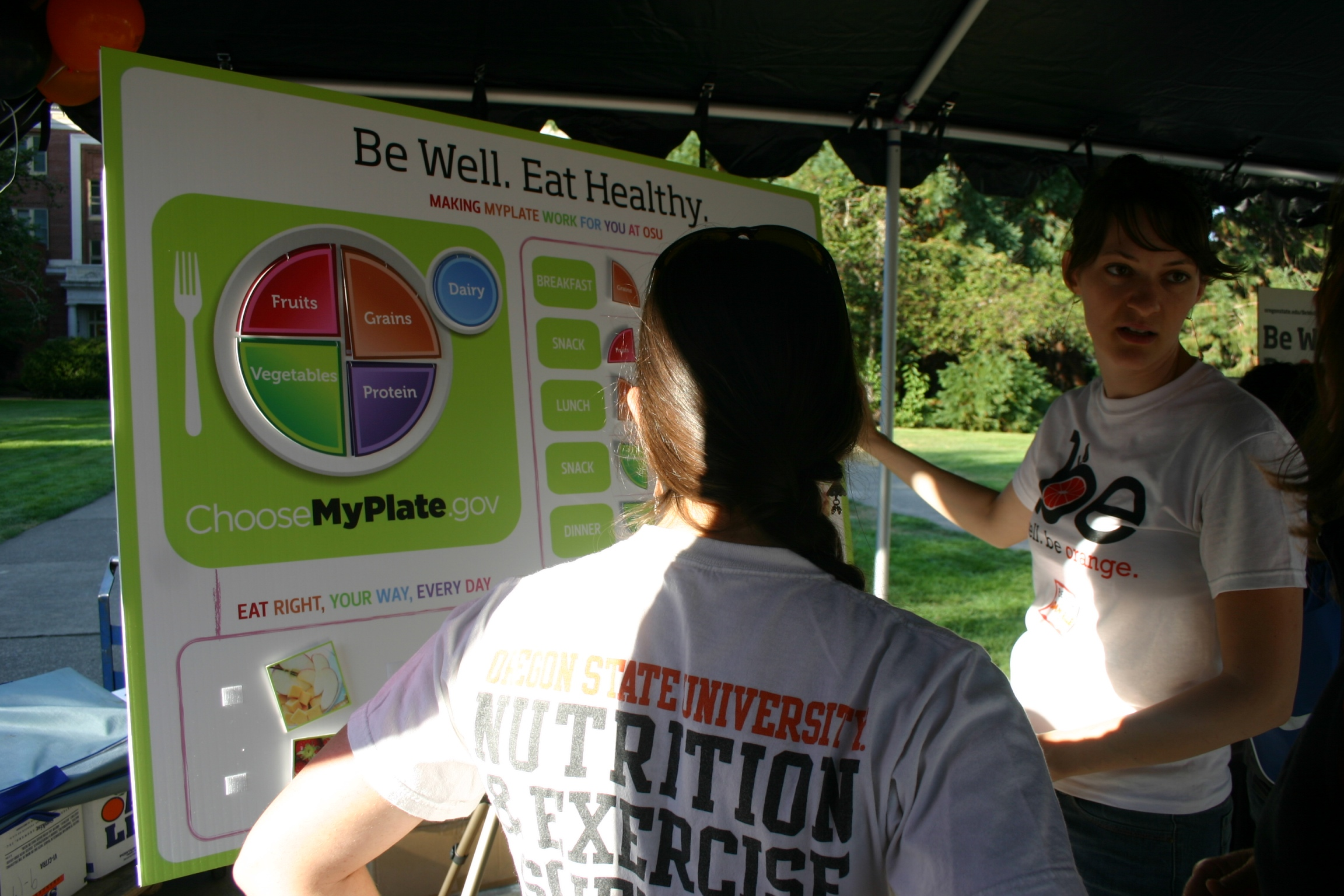
MyPlate Game

Canada's Food Guide is an example of a government-run nutrition program. Produced by Health Canada, the guide advises food quantities, provides education on balanced nutrition, and promotes physical activity in accordance with government-mandated nutrient needs. Like other nutrition programs around the world, Canada's Food Guide divides nutrition into four main food groups: vegetables and fruit, grain products, milk and alternatives, and meat and alternatives. Unlike its American counterpart, the Canadian guide references and provides alternative to meat and dairy, which can be attributed to the growing vegan and vegetarian movements.

In the US, nutritional standards and recommendations are established jointly by the US Department of Agriculture and US Department of Health and Human Services (HHS) and these recommendations are published as the Dietary Guidelines for Americans. Dietary and physical activity guidelines from the USDA are presented in the concept of MyPlate, which superseded the food pyramid, which replaced the Four Food Groups. The Senate committee currently responsible for oversight of the USDA is the Agriculture, Nutrition and Forestry Committee. Committee hearings are often televised on C-SPAN. The U.S. HHS provides a sample week-long menu that fulfills the nutritional recommendations of the government.

=== Government programs ===
Governmental organisations have been working on nutrition literacy interventions in non-primary health care settings to address the nutrition information problem in the U.S. Some programs include:

The Family Nutrition Program (FNP) is a free nutrition education program serving low-income adults around the U.S. This program is funded by the Food Nutrition Service's (FNS) branch of the United States Department of Agriculture (USDA) usually through a local state academic institution that runs the program. The FNP has developed a series of tools to help families participating in the Food Stamp Program stretch their food dollar and form healthful eating habits including nutrition education.

Expanded Food and Nutrition Education Program (ENFEP) is a unique program that currently operates in all 50 states and in American Samoa, Guam, Micronesia, Northern Mariana Islands, Puerto Rico, and the Virgin Islands. It is designed to assist limited-resource audiences in acquiring the knowledge, skills, attitudes, and changed behavior necessary for nutritionally sound diets, and to contribute to their personal development and the improvement of the total family diet and nutritional well-being.

An example of a state initiative to promote nutrition literacy is Smart Bodies, a public-private partnership between the state's largest university system and largest health insurer, Louisiana State Agricultural Center and Blue Cross and Blue Shield of Louisiana Foundation. Launched in 2005, this program promotes lifelong healthful eating patterns and physically active lifestyles for children and their families. It is an interactive educational program designed to help prevent childhood obesity through classroom activities that teach children healthful eating habits and physical exercise.

=== Education ===
Nutrition is taught in schools in many countries. In England and Wales, the Personal and Social Education and Food Technology curricula include nutrition, stressing the importance of a balanced diet and teaching how to read nutrition labels on packaging. In many schools, a Nutrition class will fall within the Family and Consumer Science (FCS) or Health departments. In some American schools, students are required to take a certain number of FCS or Health related classes. Nutrition is offered at many schools, and, if it is not a class of its own, nutrition is included in other FCS or Health classes such as: Life Skills, Independent Living, Single Survival, Freshmen Connection, Health etc. In many Nutrition classes, students learn about the food groups, the food pyramid, Daily Recommended Allowances, calories, vitamins, minerals, malnutrition, physical activity, healthful food choices, portion sizes, and how to live a healthy life.

A 1985 US National Research Council report entitled Nutrition Education in US Medical Schools concluded that nutrition education in medical schools was inadequate. Only 20% of the schools surveyed taught nutrition as a separate, required course. A 2006 survey found that this number had risen to 30%. Membership by physicians in leading professional nutrition societies such as the American Society for Nutrition has generally declined from the 1990s.

=== Professional organizations ===
In the US, Registered dietitian nutritionists (RDs or RDNs) are health professionals qualified to provide safe, evidence-based dietary advice which includes a review of what is eaten, a thorough review of nutritional health, and a personalized nutritional treatment plan through dieting. They also provide preventive and therapeutic programs at work places, schools and similar institutions. Certified Clinical Nutritionists or CCNs, are trained health professionals who also offer dietary advice on the role of nutrition in chronic disease, including possible prevention or remediation by addressing nutritional deficiencies before resorting to drugs. Government regulation especially in terms of licensing, is currently less universal for the CCN than that of RD or RDN. Another advanced Nutrition Professional is a Certified Nutrition Specialist or CNS. These Board Certified Nutritionists typically specialize in obesity and chronic disease. In order to become board certified, potential CNS candidate must pass an examination, much like Registered Dieticians. This exam covers specific domains within the health sphere including; Clinical Intervention and Human Health. The National Board of Physician Nutrition Specialists offers board certification for physicians practicing nutrition medicine.

== Nutrition for special populations ==
=== Sports nutrition ===
The protein requirement for each individual differs, as do opinions about whether and to what extent physically active people require more protein. The 2005 Recommended Dietary Allowances (RDA), aimed at the general healthy adult population, provide for an intake of 0.8 grams of protein per kilogram of body weight. A review panel stating that "no additional dietary protein is suggested for healthy adults undertaking resistance or endurance exercise".

The main fuel used by the body during exercise is carbohydrates, which is stored in muscle as glycogen – a form of sugar. During exercise, muscle glycogen reserves can be used up, especially when activities last longer than 90 min.

=== Maternal nutrition ===
Maternal nutrition is crucial during pregnancy and the child's first 1,000 days of life, encompassing the period from conception to the second birthday. During the first six months, infants rely exclusively on breast milk, which remains nutritionally sufficient despite maternal nutritional challenges. However, the mother's overall health and diet directly impact the child's well-being. The importance of maternal nutrition is a critical influence on a child's development during this pivotal period, as supported by recent studies. The child's growth is divided into four key stages: (1) pregnancy, from conception to birth; (2) breastfeeding, from birth to six months; (3) the introduction of solid foods, from six to 12 months; and (4) the transition to a family diet after 12 months, with each stage requiring specific nutritional considerations for optimal development. Additionally, there is a significant connection between nutrition, overall health, and learning, with proper nutritional intake being vital for maintaining healthy body weight and supporting normal growth during infancy, childhood, and adolescence. Given the rapid growth during infancy, this phase demands the highest relative energy and nutrient intake compared to other stages of development.

Proper nutrition during pregnancy plays a vital role in the development of the brain, requiring essential nutrients such as specific lipids, protein, folate, zinc, iodine, iron, and copper. Ensuring that children receive adequate nutrition during the first 1,000 days—from conception to the second birthday—significantly increases their chances of being born at a healthy weight. Additionally, it lowers the risk of various health conditions, including obesity and type 2 diabetes, while also fostering better learning abilities, fewer behavioral issues during early childhood, and improved overall health and economic stability in the long term.

=== Pediatric nutrition ===
Adequate nutrition is essential for the growth of children from infancy right through until adolescence. Some nutrients are specifically required for growth on top of nutrients required for normal body maintenance, in particular calcium and iron metabolism. Childhood dietary patterns are influenced by various factors, including feeding challenges and nutritional needs, with significant long-term consequences. During the first year, an infant's birth weight triples, and by age five, their birth length doubles. Brain volume doubles within the first 12 months and triples by 36 months. To support this rapid growth, solid foods are introduced after six months to supplement breast milk or infant formula. As children begin to consume more table foods in their second year, they are exposed to the same diet as their caregivers, which, along with more complex food combinations, shapes their dietary habits by 24 months. Imbalances in diet during this critical period can lead to malnutrition, with the highest risk occurring around the time of weaning, typically at 12 months in the U.S. and later in the second year globally. As a child transitions from breast milk or formula, dairy milk often becomes a key nutritional source, making the quality of the diet essential for continued growth and development.

Various feeding challenges can increase the risk of malnutrition in young children. These include individual factors like food neophobia, temperament, and sensitivity to bitter tastes, as well as family-related factors such as education, income, food insecurity, and cultural norms. Young children tend to accept foods that are familiar and routine, as preferences are shaped through repeated exposure. Successful food acceptance requires caregivers to be patient, persistent, and willing to offer previously rejected foods multiple times. However, when caregivers label their child as "picky" or selective, they often stop offering rejected foods after just 3-5 attempts, mistakenly attributing limited food acceptance to genetics rather than learned behavior. Bribing or pressuring children to eat, along with a permissive feeding style that caters to the child's preferences, can lead to food rejection. It's common for young children to experience "food jags" (repeatedly wanting the same food) and to have shifting food preferences. While some children may exhibit a strong aversion to new foods, these reactions are usually not permanent.

To address these challenges, providing a variety of nutrient-rich foods at every meal and snack is essential, allowing children to explore and develop their preferences. The concept of "responsive feeding", which involves a reciprocal relationship between the child and the caregiver during meals, is widely recommended. This approach is also supported by the U.S Dietary Guidelines for Americans and the Centers for Disease Control and Prevention.

=== Elderly nutrition ===
Malnutrition in older adults is a significant health concern, linked to increased mortality, morbidity, and physical decline, which adversely impacts daily activities and overall quality of life. This condition is common among the elderly and can also contribute to the development of geriatric syndromes. In older adults, malnutrition is typically indicated by unintentional weight loss or a low body mass index, though hidden deficiencies, such as those involving micronutrients, are often harder to detect and frequently go unnoticed, especially in community-dwelling seniors. This is generally higher among the elderly, but has different aspects in developed and undeveloped countries. In developed countries, the most common cause of malnutrition is illness, as both acute and chronic conditions can lead to or worsen nutritional deficits. As age increases the likelihood of disease, older adults are at the highest risk for nutritional challenges or malnutrition. The causes of malnutrition are complex and multifaceted, with aging processes further contributing to its development. The concerns faced with nutritional markers for the elderly are highlighted by the prevalence and determinants of malnutrition in adults over 65, encompassing factors from age-related changes to disease-related risks. The challenges in addressing, understanding, identifying, and treating malnutrition is key, noting that in some cases, targeted supplementation of macro- and micronutrients may be necessary when diet alone does not meet age-specific nutritional needs.

The World Health Organization (WHO) has identified healthy aging as a key priority from 2016 to 2030, developing a policy framework that advocates for action across multiple sectors. The program aims to help older adults (those aged 65 and over) maintain functional ability, ensuring their well-being and active participation in society. Older adults are the fastest-growing age group, and United Nations projections indicate that by 2050, their numbers will double those of children under five and exceed the population of adolescents aged 15 to 24. By 2050, global life expectancy, which was 72.6 years in 2019, is expected to increase by approximately five years. Maintaining good nutritional status and adequate nutrient intake is essential for health, quality of life, and overall well-being in older age, and it plays a crucial role in healthy aging as defined by the WHO.

==== Elderly Nutrition: Protein ====
While energy needs decrease with age, the demand for protein and certain nutrients actually rises to support normal bodily functions. Deficiencies in specific nutrients are also linked to cognitive decline, a common issue among older adults. Reduced daily food intake in the elderly often leads to insufficient protein consumption, contributing to sarcopenia, a condition marked by the loss of muscle mass. Approximately 30% of those aged 60 and above, and over 50% of individuals aged 80 and older, are affected by this condition. The inability to meet protein needs exacerbates health issues, including chronic muscle wasting and bone health deterioration, leading to functional decline and frailty. To mitigate this, older adults are advised to evenly distribute protein intake across meals—breakfast, lunch, and dinner. As aging diminishes the body's ability to synthesize muscle protein, consuming adequate essential amino acids, especially leucine, is crucial. A leucine intake of at least 3 g per meal, achieved through 25-30g of high-quality protein, is necessary for effective muscle protein synthesis.

Data from the National Health and Nutrition Examination Survey III indicates that the average protein intake among the elderly is 0.9g/kg of body weight per day, with half of this intake occurring at dinner. This uneven distribution can lead to sub-optimal protein synthesis and increased use of dietary amino acids for other processes like fat storage. Therefore, evenly distributing 30 g of protein throughout the day is recommended to enhance protein turnover and prevent muscle loss. Older adults, particularly those with acute or chronic illnesses, may require higher protein intake, ranging from 1.2 to 1.5g/kg per day, due to a reduced anabolic response. Some studies suggest that an intake of 1 g/kg per day is sufficient, while others recommend 1.3 to 1.73g/kg per day for better health outcomes. Research shows that muscle mass preservation is more effectively supported by animal protein, which has a higher essential amino acid content, than by plant protein. The timing of protein intake, protein source, and amino acid content are key factors in optimizing protein absorption in the elderly.

==== Elderly Nutrition: Zinc ====
Zinc is a vital micronutrient that plays a crucial role in enzymatic catabolism, immune cell function, DNA synthesis, and various micronutrient metabolisms. In the elderly, low serum zinc levels have been reported, which weakens the immune system, making them more susceptible to infections and increasing their risk of morbidity. Aging impairs T cell function, particularly due to zinc deficiency, and the reduced synthesis of metallothionein disrupts zinc balance in the gut and other tissues. This deficiency is primarily due to inadequate dietary zinc intake, compounded by factors such as poor mastication, oral health issues, medication use that interferes with absorption, and psychosocial factors that limit food intake. Additionally, epigenetic changes like DNA methylation may impair zinc transporters, leading to decreased zinc absorption as people age. Structural changes in the gut, including altered villus shape, mitochondrial changes, crypt elongation, collagen alterations, and increased cell replication time in the crypts, also significantly affect zinc absorption in the elderly.

The recommended daily allowance of zinc is 11 mg for older men and 8 mg for older women, with an upper tolerable limit of 25–40 mg per day, including both dietary and supplemental sources. However, individuals over 60 often consume less than 50% of the recommended zinc intake, which is crucial for proper body function. Data from the Third Health and Nutrition Survey in the United States revealed that only 42.5% of adults over 71 years old met adequate zinc intake levels, with many suffering from zinc deficiency. To reach the upper tolerable limit of 40 mg per day, zinc intake from both food and supplements must be considered to help normalize serum zinc levels in deficient elderly individuals. Dietary sources such as seafood, poultry, red meat, beans, fortified cereals, whole grains, nuts, and dairy products are beneficial for maintaining adequate zinc levels, though absorption is higher from animal proteins than plant-based sources.

==== Elderly Nutrition: Vitamin-B Complex ====
The Vitamin-B complex, which includes eight water-soluble vitamins, plays a crucial role in maintaining cellular function and preventing brain atrophy. Among the elderly, deficiencies in vitamins B12, B6, and folate are linked to cognitive decline and depressive symptoms.

The Recommended Dietary Allowance (RDA) for vitamin B12 is 0.9-2.4 μg/day, while the estimated average requirement in the U.S. and Canada is 0.7-2 μg/day. Elderly individuals with plasma vitamin B12 levels below 148 pmol/L are considered severely deficient, and those with levels between 148 and 221 pmol/L are marginally deficient. A deficiency in these B-vitamins, particularly B6, B12, and folate, is associated with elevated homocysteine levels, which increase the risk of alzheimer's disease and dementia. Increased intake of these vitamins can lower homocysteine levels and reduce the risk of these conditions. According to the National Health and Nutrition Examination Survey, about 6% of elderly Americans over 70 are severely deficient in vitamin B12, and more than 20% of those over 60 are mildly deficient. This deficiency is often due to insufficient food intake and malabsorption caused by degenerative digestive conditions, as indicated by elevated plasma gastrin levels in older adults. The deficiency of vitamin B6 among institutionalized elderly in Europe ranges from below 1% to 75%. B-vitamins are primarily found in animal-based foods, making deficiencies more common among those with limited animal food intake due to cultural, religious, or economic reasons. For vegetarians, fortified foods can be a viable alternative to ensure adequate vitamin B12 levels, especially when reducing laxative use to improve absorption.

==== Elderly Nutrition: Calcium & Vitamin D3 ====
Aging is often marked by a decline in bone mineral density, leading to an increased risk of osteoporotic fractures and reduced mobility, especially among elderly women. Women experience greater bone loss, around 2-3% per year, particularly after menopause due to estrogen deficiency. This deficiency reduces intestinal calcium absorption, decreases calcium reabsorption by the kidneys, and increases parathyroid hormone secretion, all contributing to bone resorption. Additionally, vitamin D3 deficiency, common in older adults due to reduced skin synthesis and limited sun exposure, further disrupts calcium homeostasis by decreasing intestinal absorption of calcium. As kidney function declines with age, the conversion of vitamin D3 to its active form is impaired, exacerbating the deficiency.

Serum 25(OH)D levels below 50 nmol/L are linked to muscle weakness and reduced physical function, while levels below 25-30 nmol/L increase the risk of falls and fractures. Older adults typically consume less calcium, around 600 mg/day, which heightens their susceptibility to fractures. For optimal bone health, a calcium intake of 1000–1200 mg/day is recommended, along with 800 IU/day of vitamin D3 for those with adequate sun exposure, and up to 2000 IU/day for those with limited sun exposure or obesity. However, dietary factors like phytates, oxalates, tannins, and high sodium can impair calcium absorption and retention, underscoring the need to maintain sufficient levels of both calcium and vitamin D3 through diet or supplementation to reduce the risk of pathologic fractures.

==== Elderly Nutrition: Iron ====
Iron deficiency is prevalent among the elderly and is a significant contributor to anemia in this population. As people age, the body's ability to balance iron storage and supply diminishes, leading to this condition. Multiple factors contribute to iron deficiency in older adults, including reduced food intake, frequent medication use, gastrointestinal malabsorption, and occult bleeding. Malabsorption can also result in excessive iron accumulation, further complicating the issue. Age-related anemia may also be linked to increased levels of hepcidin, a hormone that reduces iron absorption in the intestine, leading to low iron levels.

The recommended daily intake of iron for both men and women is 8 mg, with an upper limit of 45 mg/day. According to the World Health Organization, hemoglobin levels below 12 g/dl in women and 13 mg/dl in men indicate anemia. The NHANES III survey found that anemia affects 10.2% of women and 11% of men over 65, with prevalence increasing with age. Low iron levels not only decrease quality of life but are also associated with depression, fatigue, cognitive impairment, and muscle wasting.

Dietary components significantly influence iron absorption; tannins and polyphenols in tea and coffee inhibit it, while Vitamin C enhances it. However, the interaction between iron and vitamin C can generate free radicals, particularly in cases of iron overload. In iron deficiency, vitamin C aids absorption. Aspirin use in the elderly, often for cardiovascular disease, is linked to lower serum ferritin levels. Iron deficiency can be managed through an iron-rich diet or supplementation. Severe iron deficiency anemia may require oral iron therapy, typically with 300 mg of ferrous sulfate containing 60 mg of elemental iron. For those who do not respond to oral treatment, intravenous iron infusion or iron chelation for iron overload may be necessary.

=== Clinical nutrition ===
On admission to intensive care unit, energy and protein requirements are calculated to determine the targets of nutritional therapy. Enteral nutrition (administering nutrition using a feeding tube) is started within 24 to 48 hours of admission with feeding targets increased every week. The risk of aspiration (inhalation of fluid or food particles while drinking or eating) can be reduced by elevating the head, using prokinetic agent, and using a chlorhexidine mouthwash. Although the presence of bowel sounds and the amount of gastric residual volume aspirated after feeding can be used to monitor the functionality of the gastrointestinal tract before feeding is started; starting nutritional therapy at this stage regardless of the functional status is feasible and safe within 36 to 48 hours of admission. Parenteral nutrition (administering of nutrition intravenously) should be started when enteral nutrition is not possible or sufficient or in high-risk subjects.

Before undergoing surgery, a subject should avoid long periods of fasting. Oral feeding should be established as soon as possible after surgery. Other aspects of nutrition such as control of glucose, reduction in risk factors that causes stress-related catabolism or impairment of gastrointestinal functions, and encourage early physical activity to encourage protein synthesis and muscle functions.

== History of human nutrition ==
Early human nutrition was largely determined by the availability and palatability of foods. Humans evolved as omnivorous hunter-gatherers, though the diet of humans has varied significantly depending on location and climate. The diet in the tropics tended to depend more heavily on plant foods, while the diet at higher latitudes tended more towards animal products. Analyses of postcranial and cranial remains of humans and animals from the Neolithic, along with detailed bone-modification studies, have shown that cannibalism also occurred among prehistoric humans.

Agriculture developed at different times in different places, starting about 11,500 years ago, providing some cultures with a more abundant supply of grains (such as wheat, rice and maize) and potatoes; and originating staples such as bread, pasta dough, and tortillas. The domestication of animals provided some cultures with milk and dairy products.

In 2020, archeological research discovered a frescoed thermopolium (a fast-food counter) in an exceptional state of preservation from 79 in Pompeii, including 2,000-year-old foods available in some of the deep terra cotta jars.

=== Nutrition in antiquity ===
During classical antiquity, diets consisted of simple fresh or preserved whole foods that were either locally grown or transported from neighboring areas during times of crisis.

=== 18th century until today: food processing and nutrition ===
Since the Industrial Revolution in the 18th and 19th century, the food processing industry has invented many technologies that both help keep foods fresh longer and alter the fresh state of food as they appear in nature. Cooling and freezing are primary technologies used to maintain freshness, whereas many more technologies have been invented to allow foods to last longer without becoming spoiled. These latter technologies include pasteurisation, autoclavation, drying, salting, and separation of various components, all of which appearing to alter the original nutritional contents of food. Pasteurisation and autoclavation (heating techniques) have no doubt improved the safety of many common foods, preventing epidemics of bacterial infection.

Modern separation techniques such as milling, centrifugation, and pressing have enabled concentration of particular components of food, yielding flour, oils, juices, and so on, and even separate fatty acids, amino acids, vitamins, and minerals. Inevitably, such large-scale concentration changes the nutritional content of food, saving certain nutrients while removing others. Heating techniques may also reduce the content of many heat-labile nutrients such as certain vitamins and phytochemicals, and possibly other yet-to-be-discovered substances.

Because of reduced nutritional value, processed foods are often enriched or fortified with some of the most critical nutrients (usually certain vitamins) that were lost during processing. Nonetheless, processed foods tend to have an inferior nutritional profile compared to whole, fresh foods, regarding content of both sugar and high GI starches, potassium/sodium, vitamins, fiber, and of intact, unoxidized (essential) fatty acids. In addition, processed foods often contain potentially harmful substances such as oxidized fats and trans fatty acids.

A dramatic example of the effect of food processing on a population's health is the history of epidemics of beri-beri in people subsisting on polished rice. Removing the outer layer of rice by polishing it removes with it the essential vitamin thiamine, causing beri-beri. Another example is the development of scurvy among infants in the late 19th century in the United States. It turned out that the vast majority of those affected were being fed milk that had been heat-treated (as suggested by Pasteur) to control bacterial disease. Pasteurisation was effective against bacteria, but it destroyed the vitamin C.

== Research of nutrition and nutritional science ==
=== Antiquity: Start of scientific research on nutrition ===
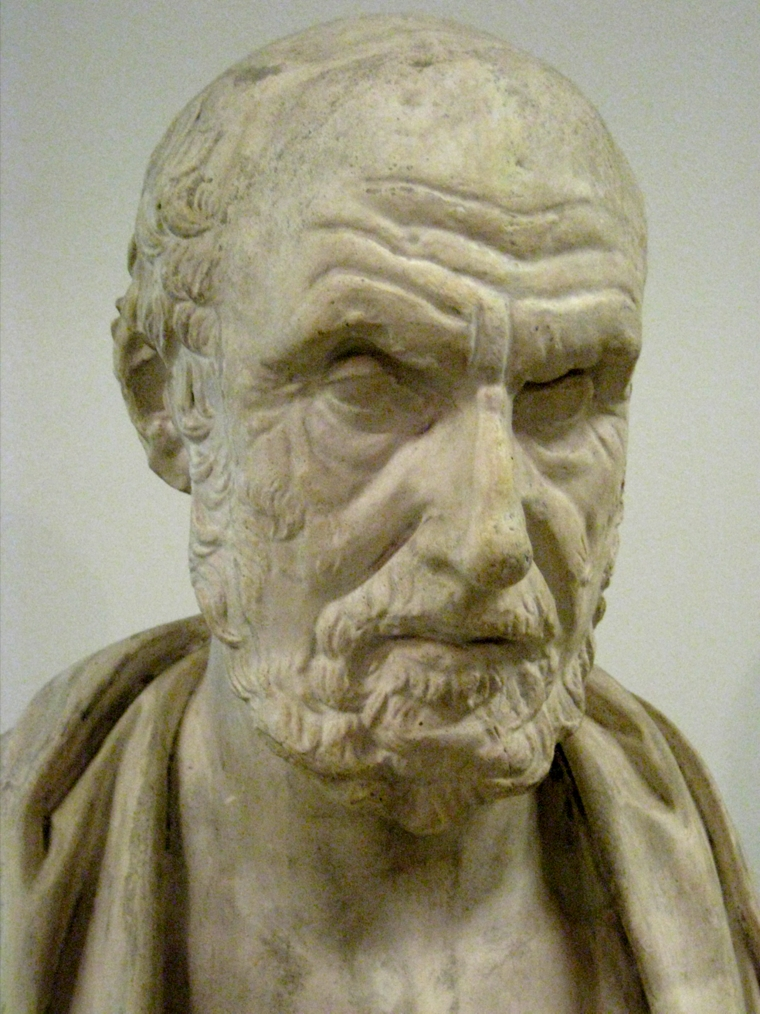
Hippocrates lived in about 400 BC, and Galen and the understanding of nutrition followed him for centuries.

Around 3000 BC the Vedic texts made mention of scientific research on nutrition. The first recorded dietary advice, carved into a Babylonian stone tablet in about 2500 BC, cautioned those with pain inside to avoid eating onions for three days. Scurvy, later found to be a vitamin C deficiency, was first described in 1500 BC in the Ebers Papyrus.

According to Walter Gratzer, the study of nutrition probably began during the 6th century BC. In China, the concept of qi developed, a spirit or "wind" similar to what Western Europeans later called pneuma. Food was classified into "hot" (for example, meats, blood, ginger, and hot spices) and "cold" (green vegetables) in China, India, Malaya, and Persia. Humours developed perhaps first in China alongside qi. Ho the Physician concluded that diseases are caused by deficiencies of elements (Wu Xing: fire, water, earth, wood, and metal), and he classified diseases as well as prescribed diets. About the same time in Italy, Alcmaeon of Croton (a Greek) wrote of the importance of equilibrium between what goes in and what goes out, and warned that imbalance would result in disease marked by obesity or emaciation.

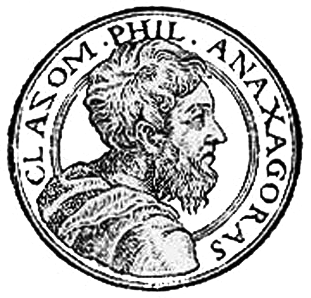
Anaxagoras

Around 475 BC, Anaxagoras wrote that food is absorbed by the human body and, therefore, contains "homeomerics" (generative components), suggesting the existence of nutrients. Around 400 BC, Hippocrates, who recognized and was concerned with obesity, which may have been common in southern Europe at the time, said, "Let food be your medicine and medicine be your food." The works that are still attributed to him, Corpus Hippocraticum, called for moderation and emphasized exercise.

Salt, pepper and other spices were prescribed for various ailments in various preparations for example mixed with vinegar. In the 2nd century BC, Cato the Elder believed that cabbage (or the urine of cabbage-eaters) could cure digestive diseases, ulcers, warts, and intoxication. Living about the turn of the millennium, Aulus Celsus, an ancient Roman doctor, believed in "strong" and "weak" foods (bread for example was strong, as were older animals and vegetables).

The Book of Daniel, dated to the second century BC, contains a description of a comparison in health of captured people following Jewish dietary laws versus the diet of the soldiers of the king of Babylon. (The story may be legendary rather than historical.)

=== 1st to 17th century ===
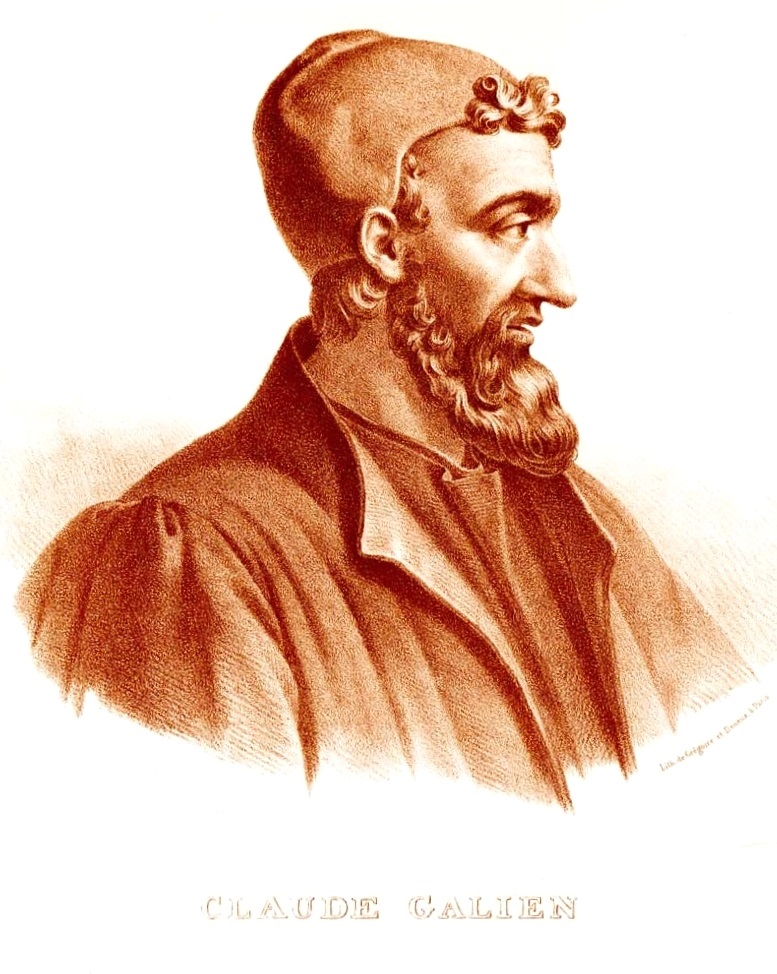
Followed for a millennium and a half, Galen (1st century) created the first coherent (although mistaken) theory of nutrition.

Galen was physician to gladiators in Pergamon, and in Rome, physician to Marcus Aurelius and the three emperors who succeeded him. In use from his life in the 1st century AD until the 17th century, it was heresy to disagree with the teachings of Galen for 1500 years. Most of Galen's teachings were gathered and enhanced in the late 11th century by Benedictine monks at the School of Salerno in Regimen sanitatis Salernitanum, which still had users in the 17th century. Galen believed in the bodily humours of Hippocrates, and he taught that pneuma is the source of life. Four elements (earth, air, fire and water) combine into "complexion", which combines into states (the four temperaments: sanguine, phlegmatic, choleric, and melancholic). The states are made up of pairs of attributes (hot and moist, cold and moist, hot and dry, and cold and dry), which are made of four humours: blood, phlegm, green (or yellow) bile, and black bile (the bodily form of the elements). Galen thought that for a person to have gout, kidney stones, or arthritis was scandalous, which Gratzer likens to Samuel Butler's Erewhon (1872) where sickness is a crime.

In the 1500s, Paracelsus was probably the first to criticize Galen publicly. Also in the 16th century, scientist and artist Leonardo da Vinci compared metabolism to a burning candle. Leonardo did not publish his works on this subject, but he was not afraid of thinking for himself and he definitely disagreed with Galen. Ultimately, 16th century works of Andreas Vesalius, sometimes called the father of modern human anatomy, overturned Galen's ideas. He was followed by piercing thought amalgamated with the era's mysticism and religion sometimes fueled by the mechanics of Newton and Galileo. Jan Baptist van Helmont, who discovered several gases such as carbon dioxide, performed the first quantitative experiment. Robert Boyle advanced chemistry. Sanctorius measured body weight. Physician Herman Boerhaave modeled the digestive process. Physiologist Albrecht von Haller worked out the difference between nerves and muscles.

=== 18th and 19th century: Lind, Lavoisier and modern science ===
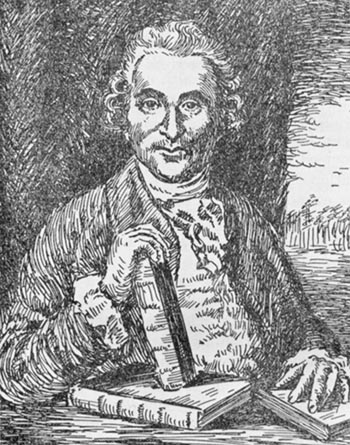
James Lind conducted in 1747 the first controlled clinical trial in modern times, and in 1753 published Treatise on Scurvy.

Sometimes forgotten during his life, James Lind, a physician in the British navy, performed the first scientific nutrition experiment in 1747. Lind discovered that lime juice saved sailors that had been at sea for years from scurvy, a deadly and painful bleeding disorder. Between 1500 and 1800, an estimated two million sailors had died of scurvy. The discovery was ignored for forty years, but after about 1850, British sailors became known as "limeys" due to the carrying and consumption of limes aboard ship. The essential vitamin C within citrus fruits would not be identified by scientists until 1932.

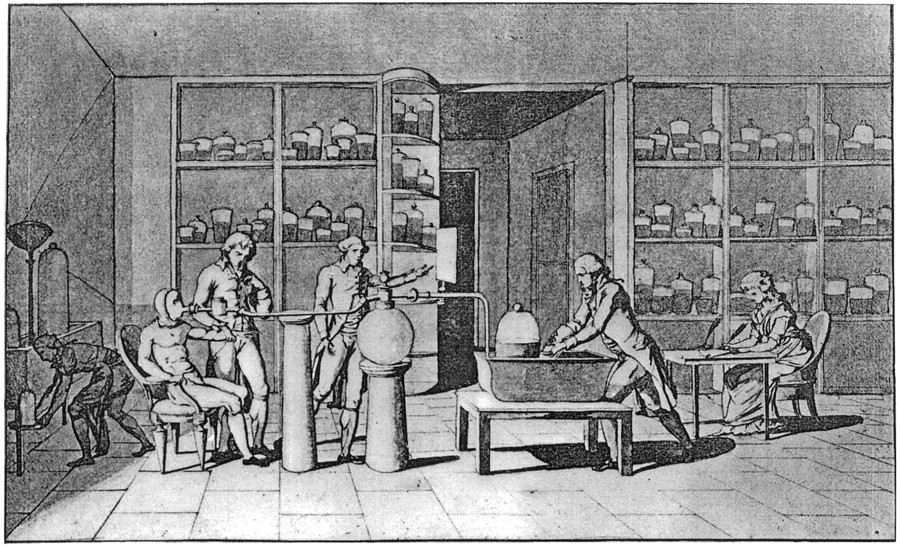
By containing his assistant, Armand Seguin, inside a rubber suit fitted with a tube sealed to his mouth with putty, Antoine Lavoisier first measured basal metabolic rate. Drawing by Madame Lavoisier (seated at right).

Around 1770, Antoine Lavoisier discovered the details of metabolism, demonstrating that the oxidation of food is the source of body heat. Called the most fundamental chemical discovery of the 18th century, Lavoisier discovered the principle of conservation of mass. His ideas made the phlogiston theory of combustion obsolete.

In 1790, George Fordyce recognized calcium as necessary for the survival of fowl. In the early 19th century, the elements carbon, nitrogen, hydrogen, and oxygen were recognized as the primary components of food, and methods to measure their proportions were developed.

In 1816, François Magendie discovered that dogs fed only carbohydrates (sugar), fat (olive oil), and water died evidently of starvation, but dogs also fed protein survived – identifying protein as an essential dietary component. William Prout in 1827 was the first person to divide foods into carbohydrates, fat, and protein. In 1840, Justus von Liebig discovered the chemical makeup of carbohydrates (sugars), fats (fatty acids) and proteins (amino acids). During the 19th century, Jean-Baptiste Dumas and von Liebig quarrelled over their shared belief that animals get their protein directly from plants (animal and plant protein are the same and that humans do not create organic compounds). With a reputation as the leading organic chemist of his day but with no credentials in animal physiology, von Liebig grew rich making food extracts like beef bouillon and infant formula that were later found to be of questionable nutritious value.

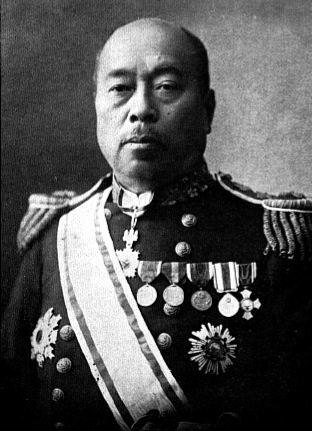
Takaki Kanehiro surmised that beriberi was a nutritional deficiency not an infectious disease.

In the early 1880s, Kanehiro Takaki observed that Japanese sailors (whose diets consisted almost entirely of white rice) developed beriberi (or endemic neuritis, a disease causing heart problems and paralysis), but British sailors and Japanese naval officers did not. Adding various types of vegetables and meats to the diets of Japanese sailors prevented the disease. (This was not because of the increased protein as Takaki supposed, but because it introduced a few parts per million of thiamine to the diet.)). In the 1860s, Claude Bernard discovered that body fat can be synthesized from carbohydrate and protein, showing that the energy in blood glucose can be stored as fat or as glycogen.

In 1896, Eugen Baumann observed iodine in thyroid glands. In 1897, Christiaan Eijkman worked with natives of Java, who also had beriberi. Eijkman observed that chickens fed the native diet of white rice developed the symptoms of beriberi but remained healthy when fed unprocessed brown rice with the outer bran intact. His assistant, Gerrit Grijns correctly identified and described the anti-beriberi substance in rice. Eijkman cured the natives by feeding them brown rice, discovering that food can cure disease. Over two decades later, nutritionists learned that the outer rice bran contains vitamin B1, also known as thiamine.

=== Early 20th century ===
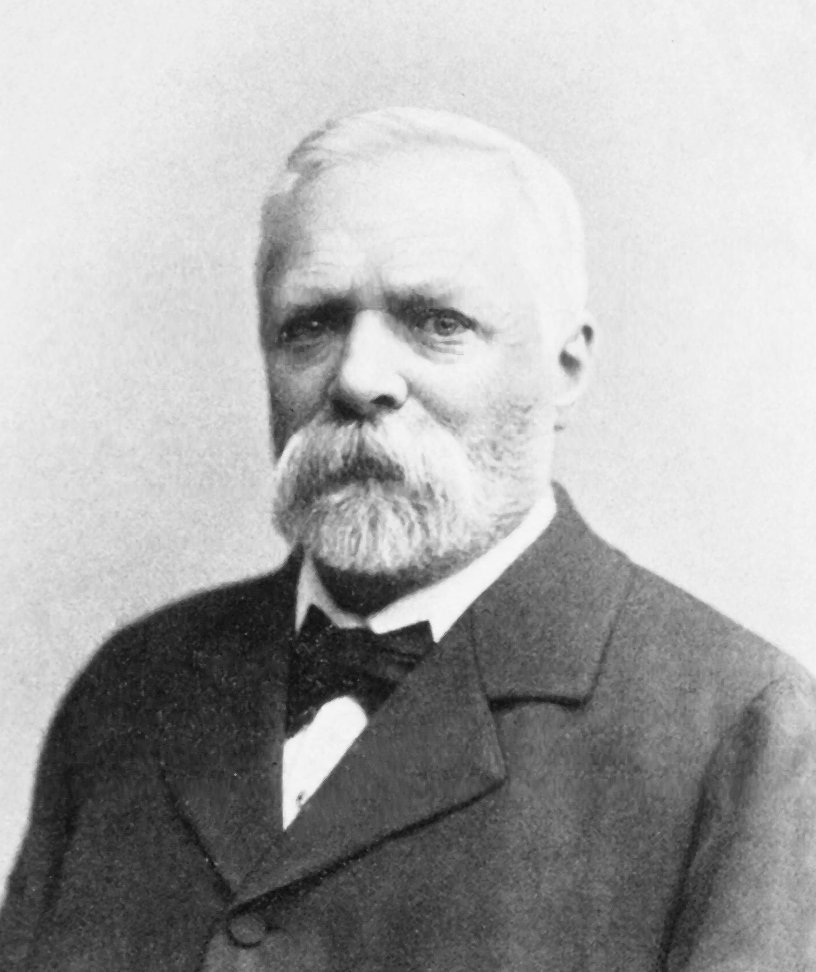
Carl von Voit has been called the father of modern dietetics.

Vitamin	Isolated in...
B_{1}: thiamin	1926
C: ascorbic acid	1926
D: calciferol	1931
B_{2}: riboflavin	1933
B_{6}: pyridoxine, pyridoxal, pyridoxamine	1936
E: tocopherol	1936
B_{3}: niacin	1937
B_{8}: biotin	1939
B_{9}: folate	1939
B_{5}: pantothenic acid	1939
A :retinol	1939
K :phylloquinone	1939
B_{12}: cynocobalamin	1948

In the early 20th century, Carl von Voit and Max Rubner independently measured caloric energy expenditure in different species of animals, applying principles of physics in nutrition. In 1906, Edith G. Willcock and Frederick Hopkins showed that the amino acid tryptophan aids the well-being of mice but it did not assure their growth. In the middle of twelve years of attempts to isolate them, Hopkins said in a 1906 lecture that "unsuspected dietetic factors", other than calories, protein, and minerals, are needed to prevent deficiency diseases. In 1907, Stephen M. Babcock and Edwin B. Hart started the cow feeding, single-grain experiment, which took nearly four years to complete.

In 1912 Casimir Funk coined the term vitamin to label a vital factor in the diet: from the words "vital" and "amine", because these unknown substances preventing scurvy, beriberi, and pellagra, and were thought then to derive from ammonia. In 1913 Elmer McCollum discovered the first vitamins, fat-soluble vitamin A and water-soluble vitamin B (in 1915; later identified as a complex of several water-soluble vitamins) and named vitamin C as the then-unknown substance preventing scurvy. Lafayette Mendel (1872–1935) and Thomas Osborne (1859–1929) also performed pioneering work on vitamins A and B.

In 1919, Sir Edward Mellanby incorrectly identified rickets as a vitamin A deficiency because he could cure it in dogs with cod liver oil. In 1922, McCollum destroyed the vitamin A in cod liver oil, but found that it still cured rickets. Also in 1922, H.M. Evans and L.S. Bishop discover vitamin E as essential for rat pregnancy, originally calling it "food factor X" until 1925.

In 1925 Hart discovered that iron absorption requires trace amounts of copper. In 1927 Adolf Otto Reinhold Windaus synthesized vitamin D, for which he won the Nobel Prize in Chemistry in 1928. In 1928 Albert Szent-Györgyi isolated ascorbic acid, and in 1932 proved that it is vitamin C by preventing scurvy. In 1935 he synthesized it, and in 1937 won a Nobel Prize for his efforts. Szent-Györgyi concurrently elucidated much of the citric acid cycle.

In the 1930s, William Cumming Rose identified essential amino acids, necessary protein components that the body cannot synthesize. In 1935 Eric Underwood and Hedley Marston independently discovered the necessity of cobalt. In 1936, Eugene Floyd DuBois showed that work and school performance are related to caloric intake. In 1938, Erhard Fernholz discovered the chemical structure of vitamin E. It was synthesised the same year by Paul Karrer.

Oxford University closed down its nutrition department after World War II because the subject seemed to have been completed between 1912 and 1944.

=== Institutionalization of nutritional science in the 1950s ===
Nutritional science as a separate, independent science discipline was institutionalized in the 1950s. At the instigation of the British physiologist John Yudkin at the University of London, the degrees Bachelor of Science and Master of Science in nutritional science were established. The first students were admitted in 1953, and in 1954 the Department of Nutrition was officially opened. In Germany, institutionalization followed in November 1956, when Hans-Diedrich Cremer was appointed to the chair for human nutrition in Giessen. Over time, seven other universities with similar institutions followed in Germany. From the 1950s to 1970s, a focus of nutritional science was on dietary fat and sugar. From the 1970s to the 1990s, attention was put on diet-related chronic diseases and supplementation.

== See also ==
=== General ===
- Health
- Dieting
- Healthy diet

=== Substances ===
- Dietary supplement
- Food fortification
- Nutraceuticals
- Probiotic
- Prebiotic (nutrition)

=== Healthy eating advice and tools ===
- 5 A Day
- Canada's Food Guide
- Food group
- Food guide pyramid
- Healthy eating pyramid
- MyPyramid
- Nutritional rating systems
- Nutrition scale

=== Types of food ===
- Diet food
- Fast food
- Functional food
- Junk food
- Food supplement
- Ultra-processed food
- Edible seaweed

=== Academic publishing ===
- Advances in Nutrition
- Annual Review of Nutrition
- The American Journal of Clinical Nutrition

=== Biology ===
- Basal metabolic rate
- Bioenergetics
- Digestion
- Enzyme
- Nutrigenomics

=== Lists ===
- List of diets
- List of food additives
- List of illnesses related to poor nutrition
- List of life extension related topics
- List of macronutrients
- List of micronutrients
- List of publications in nutrition
- List of unrefined sweeteners
- List of antioxidants
- List of phytochemicals

=== Organizations ===
- Academy of Nutrition and Dietetics
- American Society for Nutrition
- British Dietetic Association
- Food and Drug Administration
- Food Fortification Initiative
- Society for Nutrition Education
- Milan Charter

=== Professions ===
- Dietitian
- Nutritionist
- Food Studies
