= Eleostearic acid =

Eleostearic acid is a fatty acid, one of two isomers of octadecatrienoic acid:

- α-Eleostearic acid or (9Z,11E,13E)-9,11,13-octadecatrienoic acid, which occurs in tung oil and bitter gourd seed oil;
- β-Eleostearic acid or (9E,11E,13E)-9,11,13-octadecatrienoic acid.

The carboxylate (or conjugate base) of eleostearic acid is eleostearate. Esters of eleostearic acid are called eleostearates.
