= Linolenic acid =

Linolenic acid is a type of naturally occurring fatty acid. It can refer to either of the two octadecatrienoic acids listed below. Linolenate (in the form of triglyceride esters of linolenic acid) is often found in vegetable oils; traditionally, such fatty acylates are reported as the fatty acids:

- α-Linolenic acid, an omega-3 (n-3) essential fatty acid
- γ-Linolenic acid, an omega-6 (n-6) fatty acid

== See also ==
- Linoleic acid, the similarly named essential fatty acid
