= Octadecatrienoic acid =

(9Z,11E,13E)-Octadeca-9,11,13-trienoic acid (α-eleostearic acid)

An octadecatrienoic acid is a chemical compound with formula C_{18}H_{30}O_{2}, a polyunsaturated fatty acid whose molecule has an 18-carbon unbranched backbone with three double bonds.

The name refers to many different structural and configurational isomers, that differ in the position of the double bonds along the backbone and on whether they are in cis (Z) or trans (E) configuration. Some isomers have considerable biological, pharmaceutical, or industrial importance, such as:

- α-Linolenic acid (9Z,12Z,15Z), found in many cooking oils
- γ-Linolenic acid (6Z,9Z,12Z), found in the evening primrose (Oenothera biennis)
- Pinolenic acid (5Z,9Z,12Z), found in the seeds of pines (Pinus species)
- Columbinic acid (5E,9Z,12Z), found in Thalictrum seed oils
- α-Eleostearic acid (9Z,11E,13E), the main component of tung oil, produced from the nuts of tung tree (Vernicia fordii)
- β-Eleostearic acid (9E,11E,13E)
- Catalpic acid (9E,11E,13Z), found in the seeds of yellow catalpa (Catalpa ovata) and southern catalpa (Catalpa bignonioides)
- Punicic acid (9Z,11E,13Z), found in pomegranate (Punica granatum) seed oil
- α-Calendic acid (8E,10E,12Z), found in the pot marigold (Calendula officinalis)
- β-Calendic acid (8E,10E,12E), found in the pot marigold (Calendula officinalis) in small or trace amounts, less than 2% of total lipids
- Jacaric acid (8Z,10E,12Z), found in the blue jacaranda (Jacaranda mimosifolia)
