= 15,16-Dihydroxy-α-eleostearic acid =

Names
- Preferred IUPAC name (9Z,11E,13E)-15,16-Dihydroxyoctadeca-9,11,13-trienoic acid

Identifiers
CAS Number	1083078-83-4
3D model (JSmol)	Interactive image
ChemSpider	57558074
PubChem CID	25156647
CompTox Dashboard (EPA)	DTXSID10648912
- InChI: InChI=1S/C18H30O4/c1-2-16(19)17(20)14-12-10-8-6-4-3-5-7-9-11-13-15-18(21)22/h4,6,8,10,12,14,16-17,19-20H,2-3,5,7,9,11,13,15H2,1H3,(H,21,22)/b6-4-,10-8+,14-12+ Key: OBMDTPZEEDLBKM-ZMLXCLEUSA-N
- SMILES: OC(CCCCCCC/C=C\C=C\C=C\C(O)C(O)CC)=O

Properties
Chemical formula	C_{18}H_{30}O_{4}
Molar mass	310.434 g·mol^{−1}
- Except where otherwise noted, data are given for materials in their standard state (at 25 °C [77 °F], 100 kPa). verify (what is ?) Infobox references

15,16-Dihydroxy-α-eleostearic acid, or 15,16-Dihydroxy-(9Z,11E,13E)-9,11,13-octadecatrienoic acid, is an organic compound with formula C_{18}H_{30}O_{4}, or H_{3}C-CH_{2}-(-CH(OH)-)_{2}(-CH=CH-)_{3}-(-CH_{2}-)_{7}-(C=O)OH. It can be seen as derived from α-eleostearic acid by the replacement of two hydrogen atoms by two hydroxyl (OH) groups.

The compound is found in the pulp and seeds of bitter melons (the fruits of Momordica charantia). It has been found to induce apoptosis in HL60 leukemia cells in vitro at a concentration of 160 μM, although it is less potent in this regard than the unsubstituted α-eleostearic acid (also found in the seed oil). While α-eleostearic acid has been found to prevent carcinogenesis in rats, this derivative does not seem to have that effect.

The compound can be extracted from the fruit with ethanol, and is soluble in ethyl acetate but not in water or acetone.

== See also ==
- α-Eleostearic acid
