= Milan Charter =

The Milan Charter is a document that sets out some principles and objectives on the subject of nutrition, environmental sustainability, and human rights.

It was proposed at Expo 2015 during the Milan Universal Exposition (1 May - 31 October 2015). It was presented to the Secretary-General of the United Nations (UN), Ban Ki-moon on 16 October 2015.

The document discusses commitments regarding the right to food as one of the fundamental human rights enshrined in the Universal Declaration of Human Rights, describing a lack of access to nutritious and healthy food, clean water, and energy as a violation of human dignity. It describes worldwide collective action as essential in ensuring this right. It has been supported by several stakeholders, including Compassion in World Farming.

The underwriters of the Charter of Milan are committed to fighting malnutrition, promoting equitable access to natural resources, and sustainable management of production processes.

In 2020, a second Charter was created on Urban Obesity. It was supported by 14 Italian organisations.
