= Jacaric acid =

18-Carbon polyunsaturated fatty acid

Names
- Preferred IUPAC name (8Z,10E,12Z)-Octadeca-8,10,12-trienoic acid
- Other names Jacaric acid

Identifiers
CAS Number	28872-28-8
3D model (JSmol)	Interactive image
ChemSpider	4445944
PubChem CID	5282817
UNII	APY53D8J4D
CompTox Dashboard (EPA)	DTXSID901027545
- InChI: InChI=1S/C18H30O2/c1-2-3-4-5-6-7-8-9-10-11-12-13-14-15-16-17-18(19)20/h6-11H,2-5,12-17H2,1H3,(H,19,20)/b7-6-,9-8+,11-10- Key: DQGMPXYVZZCNDQ-KDQYYBQISA-N; InChI=1/C18H30O2/c1-2-3-4-5-6-7-8-9-10-11-12-13-14-15-16-17-18(19)20/h6-11H,2-5,12-17H2,1H3,(H,19,20)/b7-6-,9-8+,11-10- Key: DQGMPXYVZZCNDQ-KDQYYBQIBA
- SMILES: O=C(O)CCCCCC/C=C\C=C\C=C/CCCCC

Properties
Chemical formula	C_{18}H_{30}O_{2}
Molar mass	278.436 g·mol^{−1}
Melting point	44 °C (111 °F; 317 K)
- Except where otherwise noted, data are given for materials in their standard state (at 25 °C [77 °F], 100 kPa). verify (what is ?) Infobox references

Jacaric acid is a conjugated polyunsaturated fatty acid with a melting point of 44 °C. It occurs naturally in the seeds of the Jacaranda mimosifolia, which contain about 36% jacaric acid.
