= Α-Eleostearic acid =

18-Carbon polyunsaturated fatty acid

α-Eleostearic acid
- α-Eleostearic acid

Names
- Preferred IUPAC name (9Z,11E,13E)-Octadeca-9,11,13-trienoic acid

Identifiers
CAS Number	506-23-0
3D model (JSmol)	Interactive image
Beilstein Reference	1726551
ChEBI	CHEBI:10275
ChemSpider	4444560
ECHA InfoCard	100.007.300
EC Number	208-029-2
KEGG	C08315
PubChem CID	5281115
UNII	934U1Q8QHG
CompTox Dashboard (EPA)	DTXSID00897457
- InChI: InChI=1S/C18H30O2/c1-2-3-4-5-6-7-8-9-10-11-12-13-14-15-16-17-18(19)20/h5-10H,2-4,11-17H2,1H3,(H,19,20)/b6-5+,8-7+,10-9- Key: CUXYLFPMQMFGPL-WPOADVJFSA-N; InChI=1/C18H30O2/c1-2-3-4-5-6-7-8-9-10-11-12-13-14-15-16-17-18(19)20/h5-10H,2-4,11-17H2,1H3,(H,19,20)/b6-5+,8-7+,10-9-
- SMILES: O=C(O)CCCCCCC/C=C\C=C\C=C\CCCC

Properties
Chemical formula	C_{18}H_{30}O_{2}
Molar mass	278.43 g/mol
Melting point	48 °C (118 °F; 321 K)
- Except where otherwise noted, data are given for materials in their standard state (at 25 °C [77 °F], 100 kPa). verify (what is ?) Infobox references

α-Eleostearic acid or (9Z,11E,13E)-octadeca-9,11,13-trienoic acid, is an organic compound, a conjugated fatty acid and one of the isomers of octadecatrienoic acid. It is often called simply eleostearic acid although there is also a β-eleostearic acid (the all-trans or (9E,11E,13E) isomer). Its high degree of unsaturation gives tung oil its properties as a drying oil.

== Biochemical properties ==
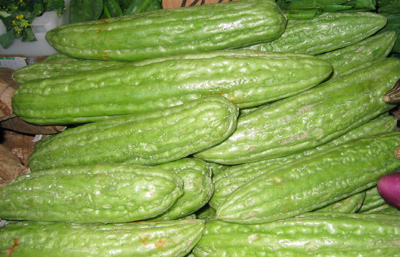
α-Eleostearic acid makes up about 60% of the fatty acids from bitter gourd oil.

In their pioneering work on essential fatty acids, George Burr, Mildred Burr and Elmer Miller compared the nutritional properties of α-eleostearic acid (ESA) to that of its isomer alpha-linolenic acid (ALA). ALA relieved essential fatty acid deficiency; ESA did not.

In rats, α-eleostearic acid is converted to a conjugated linoleic acid. The compound has been found to induce programmed cell death of fat cells, and of HL60 leukemia cells in vitro at a concentration of 20 μM. Diets containing 0.01% bitter gourd seed oil (0.006% as α-eleostearic acid) were found to prevent azoxymethane-induced colon carcinogenesis in rats.

== Sources ==
α-Eleostearic acid is found in the oils extracted from seeds. Tung oil has 82% α-eleostearic acid. Bitter gourd seed oil has 60% α-eleostearic acid.

== Etymology ==
Eleo- is a prefix derived from the Greek word for olive, ἔλαιον.

== See also ==
- 15,16-Dihydroxy-alpha-eleostearic acid
