= Β-Eleostearic acid =

18-Carbon polyunsaturated fatty acid

β-Eleostearic acid

Names
- Preferred IUPAC name (9E,11E,13E)-Octadeca-9,11,13-trienoic acid
- Other names (E,E,E)-9,11,13-Octadecatrienoic acid

Identifiers
CAS Number	544-73-0
3D model (JSmol)	Interactive image
ChEBI	CHEBI:38384
ChemSpider	4445947
ECHA InfoCard	100.008.071
PubChem CID	5282820
UNII	LA17B88161
CompTox Dashboard (EPA)	DTXSID901016803
- InChI: InChI=1S/C18H30O2/c1-2-3-4-5-6-7-8-9-10-11-12-13-14-15-16-17-18(19)20/h5-10H,2-4,11-17H2,1H3,(H,19,20)/b6-5+,8-7+,10-9+ Key: CUXYLFPMQMFGPL-SUTYWZMXSA-N
- SMILES: O=C(O)CCCCCCC\C=C\C=C\C=C\CCCC

Properties
Chemical formula	C_{18}H_{30}O_{2}
Molar mass	278.436 g·mol^{−1}
Melting point	71.5 °C (160.7 °F; 344.6 K)
- Except where otherwise noted, data are given for materials in their standard state (at 25 °C [77 °F], 100 kPa). verify (what is ?) Infobox references

β-Eleostearic acid, or (9E,11E,13E)-octadeca-9,11,13-trienoic acid, is an organic compound with formula C_{18}H_{30}O_{2} or H_{3}C(CH_{2})_{3}(CH=CH)_{3}(CH_{2})_{7}COOH. It is an all-trans isomer of octadecatrienoic acid. Its cytotoxicity and ability to induce cell apoptosis means it possesses potential anti-tumor capabilities.

== See also ==
- α-Eleostearic acid, the (9Z,11E,13E)-isomer, found in tung oil and bitter gourd seed oil.
