= Punicic acid =

18-Carbon polyunsaturated fatty acid

- Punicic acid

Names
- Preferred IUPAC name (9Z,11E,13Z)-Octadeca-9,11,13-trienoic acid

Identifiers
CAS Number	544-72-9
3D model (JSmol)	Interactive image
ChEBI	CHEBI:8638
ChemSpider	4444570
PubChem CID	5281126
UNII	VFQ03H211O
CompTox Dashboard (EPA)	DTXSID10897463
- InChI: InChI=1S/C18H30O2/c1-2-3-4-5-6-7-8-9-10-11-12-13-14-15-16-17-18(19)20/h5-10H,2-4,11-17H2,1H3,(H,19,20)/b6-5-,8-7+,10-9- Key: CUXYLFPMQMFGPL-BGDVVUGTSA-N; InChI=1/C18H30O2/c1-2-3-4-5-6-7-8-9-10-11-12-13-14-15-16-17-18(19)20/h5-10H,2-4,11-17H2,1H3,(H,19,20)/b6-5-,8-7+,10-9- Key: CUXYLFPMQMFGPL-BGDVVUGTBE
- SMILES: CCCC\C=C/C=C/C=C\CCCCCCCC(=O)O

Properties
Chemical formula	C_{18}H_{30}O_{2}
Molar mass	278.43 g/mol
Melting point	44 to 45 °C (111 to 113 °F; 317 to 318 K)
- Except where otherwise noted, data are given for materials in their standard state (at 25 °C [77 °F], 100 kPa). verify (what is ?) Infobox references

Punicic acid (also called trichosanic acid) is a polyunsaturated fatty acid, 18:3 cis-9, trans-11, cis-13. It is named for the pomegranate, (Punica granatum), and is obtained from pomegranate seed oil. It has also been found in the seed oils of snake gourd.

Punicic acid is a conjugated linolenic acid or CLnA; i.e. it has three conjugated double bonds. It is chemically similar to the conjugated linoleic acids, or CLA, which have two. It has also been classified as an "n-5" or "omega-5" polyunsaturated fatty acid. In lab rats, punicic acid was converted to the CLA rumenic acid (9Z11E-CLA).

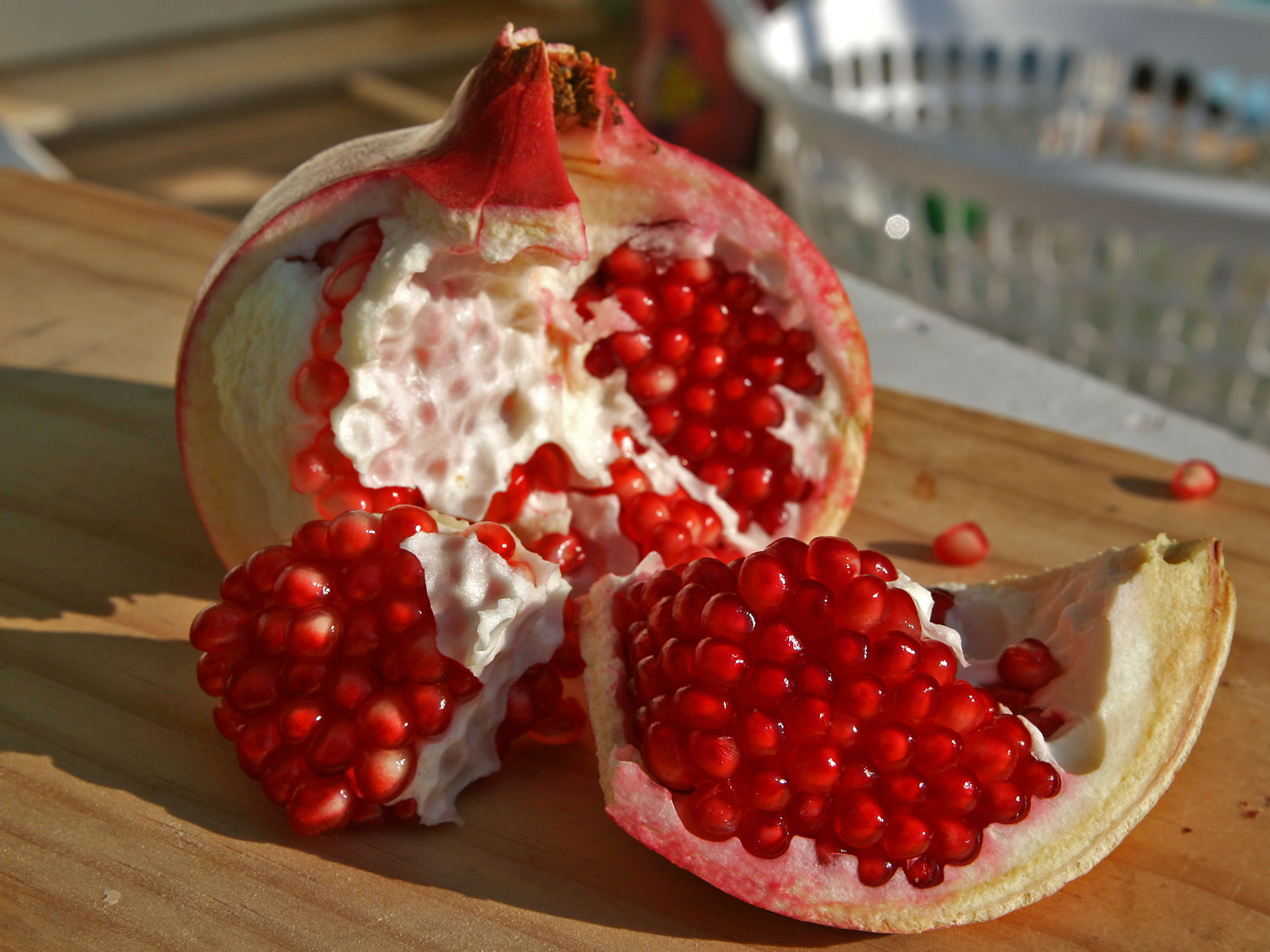
Punicic acid makes up around 65% of the fatty acids in pomegranate seed oil.

== See also ==
- Punicalagin
- Polyunsaturated fat § Conjugated fatty acids
