= Catalpic acid =

18-Carbon polyunsaturated fatty acid

Names
- Preferred IUPAC name (9E,11E,13Z)-Octadeca-9,11,13-trienoic acid

Identifiers
CAS Number	4337-71-7
3D model (JSmol)	Interactive image
ChemSpider	4532629
PubChem CID	5385589
UNII	27D2CW7K2P
CompTox Dashboard (EPA)	DTXSID901026854
- InChI: InChI=1S/C18H30O2/c1-2-3-4-5-6-7-8-9-10-11-12-13-14-15-16-17-18(19)20/h5-10H,2-4,11-17H2,1H3,(H,19,20)/b6-5-,8-7+,10-9+ Key: CUXYLFPMQMFGPL-WJTNUVGISA-N; InChI=1/C18H30O2/c1-2-3-4-5-6-7-8-9-10-11-12-13-14-15-16-17-18(19)20/h5-10H,2-4,11-17H2,1H3,(H,19,20)/b6-5-,8-7+,10-9+ Key: CUXYLFPMQMFGPL-WJTNUVGIBJ
- SMILES: O=C(O)CCCCCCC\C=C\C=C\C=C/CCCC

Properties
Chemical formula	C_{18}H_{30}O_{2}
Molar mass	278.44 g/mol
Melting point	32 °C (90 °F; 305 K)
- Except where otherwise noted, data are given for materials in their standard state (at 25 °C [77 °F], 100 kPa). verify (what is ?) Infobox references

Catalpic acid is a conjugated polyunsaturated fatty acid. The melting point of this fatty acid is 32 °C. Catalpic acid occurs naturally in the seeds of yellow catalpa (Catalpa ovata) and southern catalpa (Catalpa bignonioides). Seeds of Catalpa species contain about 40% catalpic acid.
