= Flour extraction =

Process of refining whole-grain flour

Flour extraction is the common process of refining whole-grain flour first milled from grain or grist by running it through sifting devices, often called flour dressers.

== Definition ==
For centuries, much of the flour milled for human consumption has been run through some kind of “bolting”, sifting or “extraction” process. This flour is extracted from whole grains for one of two reasons; firstly, to decrease the tendency for rancidity. The milling systems with a lower extraction percentage discard most of the rancidity-prone nutritional minerals and oils associated with the bran and germ elements, of the wheat kernel. Baking functionality is the other issue, with increased loaf volume accomplished by simply removing just the larger flour particles. Like the lower extraction white flour, higher extraction flour still creates a smoother dough more inclined to hold the gas created during fermentation. However, higher-extraction flour also retains the sensory flavors and nutrition associated with the smaller bran and germ elements that are also extracted along with the endosperm.

== History ==
“White flour”, extracted from whole grains by roller mills that eliminates the rancidity prone bran and germ elements of the wheat kernel was introduced in the late 19th century. By first hydrating the outer wheat kernel bran and germ elements to keep them intact, this new system then employed steel rollers instead of circulating stones to repetitively fracture the remaining starchy endosperm element into fine particles. The extracted endosperm flour came to be known as “white flour” as this element of the wheat kernel is white. This system ingeniously accomplished the extraction of most of the starchy endosperm while separating out virtually all of the bran and germ elements, extracting about 72% of the whole grain kernel. Roller milling eventually came (and continues) to dominate the world’s flour production. Well over 90% of U.S. flour production in 2017 was roller milled white enriched flour.

Once roller milling made white flour affordable for almost everyone, public health issues arose. As scientists learned more about the crucial health contributions of the bran and the germ, artificial enrichment of white flour was introduced that restores a small part of the nutrition lost by eliminating all the bran and germ elements.

== Benefits ==
There are generally two benefits from extraction:

1. The highest extraction typically retains over 85% of the original volume by focusing on just improving functionality (increased loaf volume) without a significant sensory loss. A fine Whole Grain Flour is used to just remove the larger flour particles and is commonly referred to by Artisan bakers as High Extraction flour. It is primarily used to produce a variety of non-whole grain bread products.
2. More aggressive sifting focuses on both functionality and reduction of the potential for rancidity by eliminating 100% of the bran and germ in the kernel. This lower extraction (typically 72% or less) is most commonly Roller Milled White Enriched flour yielding a significant selection of flour types used for a variety of baking applications, the most significant of which is white bread.

== Higher extraction flour ==
The general availability of refrigeration and even flour itself, has diminished the significance of the rancidity/shelf life/keeping quality issue of whole grain flour. Higher extraction rates just focus on the elimination of the larger flour particles to increase loaf volume while retaining the majority of the nutritional bran and germ elements along with the endosperm. This is accomplished by direct extraction of the fine whole grain flour output of impact or attrition mills. Millers have been able to match the finer particle size distribution of low extraction roller-milled white flour (72% extraction) that eliminated all the bran and germ elements with a higher +88% extraction that retains most of them.
