= Roller mill =

Mill that uses cylindrical rollers to crush or grind various materials

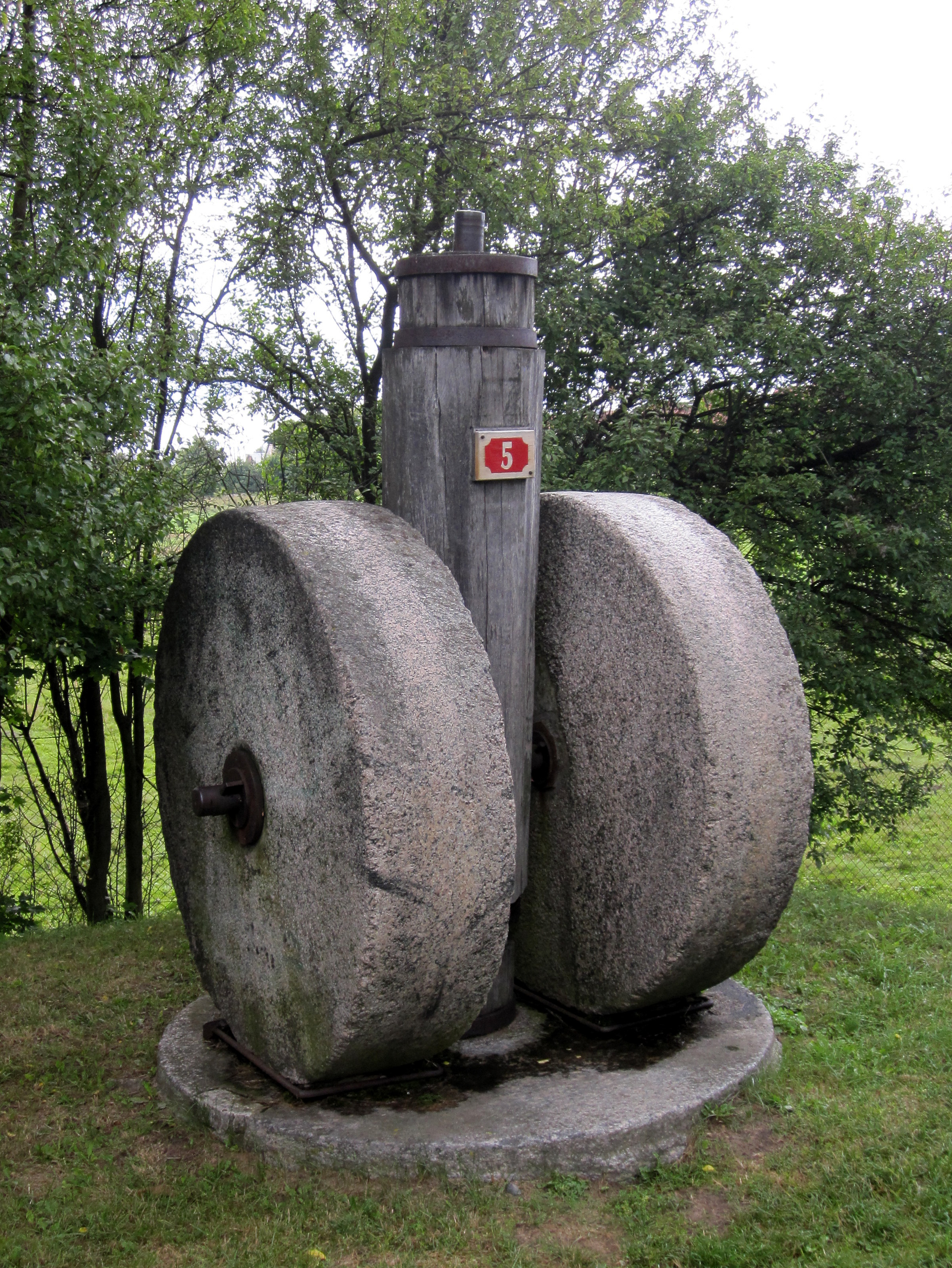
An early 20th-century oil-seed roller-mill from the Olsztyn district, Poland

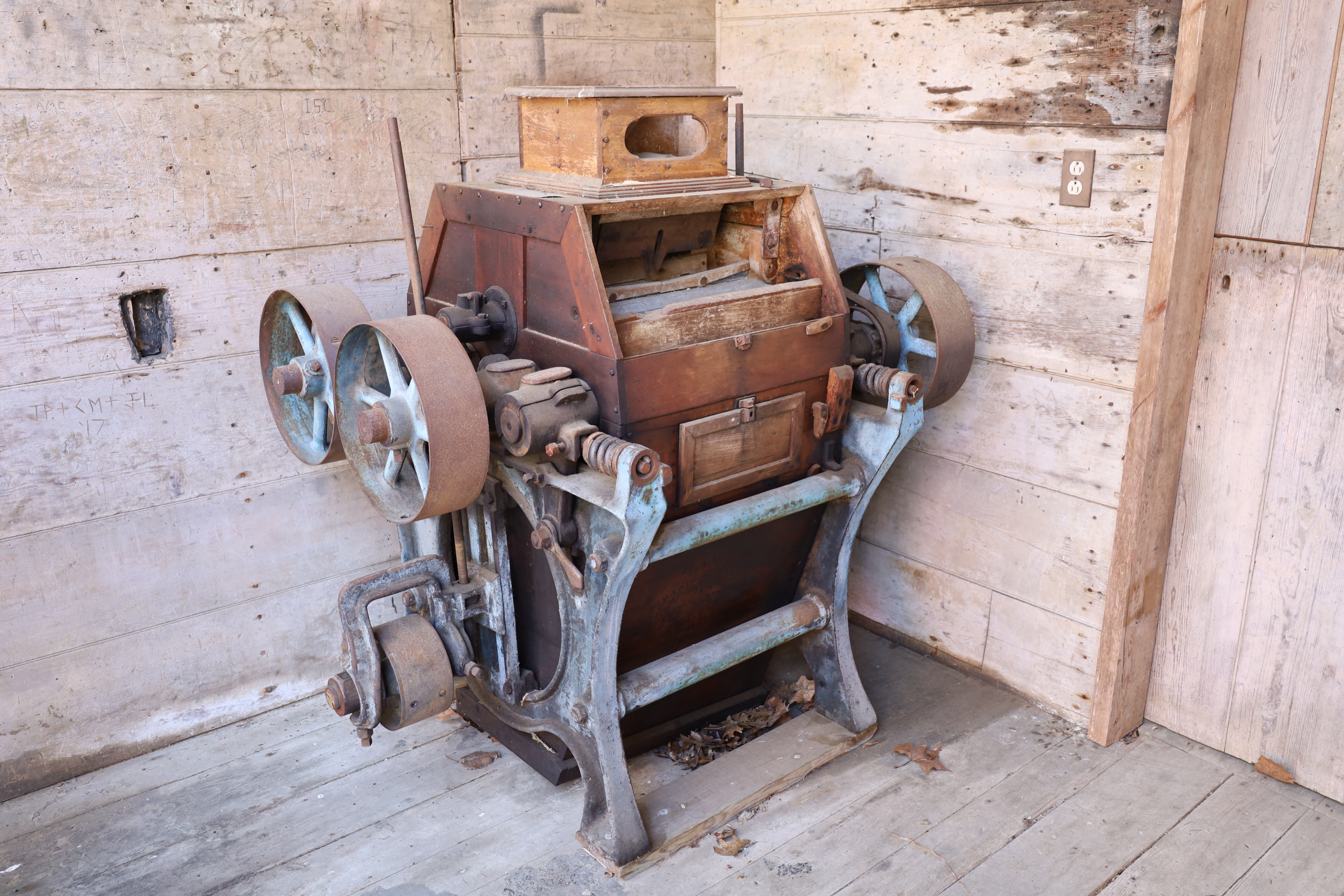
A late 19th century double roller mill displayed at Cook's Mill in Greenville, West Virginia in 2022

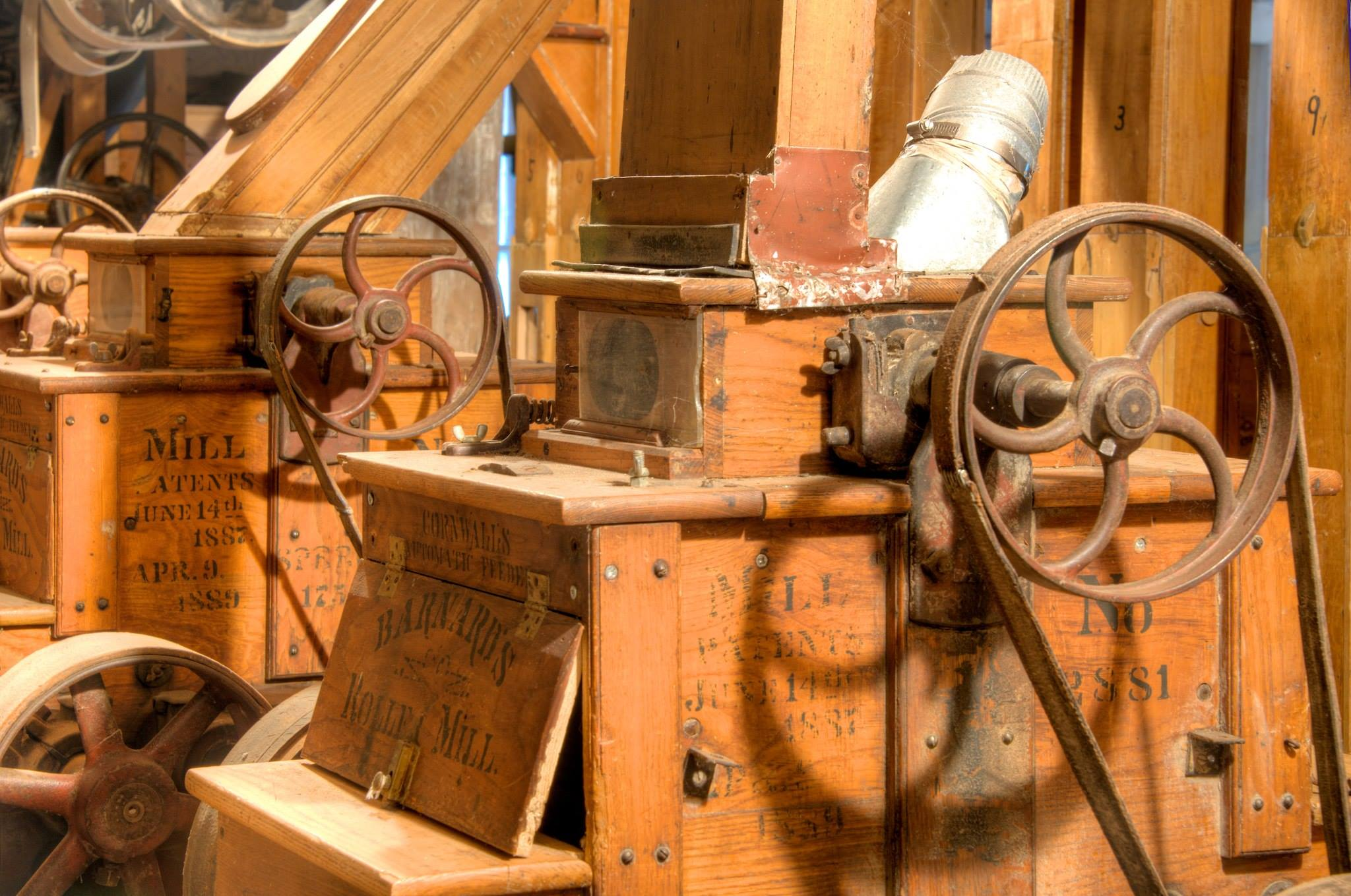
Closeup of Barnard's Roller Mill, New Hope Mills Complex, New York

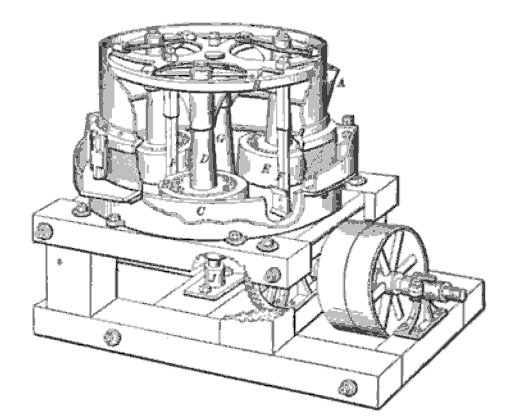
Cutaway drawing of a centrifugal roller mill for mining applications, 1913

Roller mills are mills that use cylindrical rollers, either in opposing pairs or against flat plates, to crush or grind various materials, such as grain, ore, gravel, plastic, and others. Roller grain mills are an alternative to traditional millstone arrangements in gristmills. Roller mills for rock complement other types of mills, such as ball mills and hammermills, in such industries as the mining and processing of ore and construction aggregate; cement milling; and recycling.

== Types ==
=== Two-roller mills ===
Two-roller mills are the simplest variety, in which the material is crushed between two rollers before it continues on to its final destination. The spacing between the rollers can be adjusted by the operator. Thinner spacing usually leads to that material being crushed into smaller pieces.

=== Four-roller mills ===
Four-roller mills have two sets of rollers. in a four-roller mill, the grain first goes through rollers with a rather wide gap, which separates the seed from the husk without much damage to the husk, but leaves large grits. Flour is sieved out of the cracked grain, and then the coarse grist and husks are sent through the second set of rollers, which further crush the grist without damaging the crusts. Similarly, there are three-roller mills, in which one of the rollers is used twice.

=== Five- and six-roller mills ===
Six-roller mills have three sets of rollers. In this type of mill, the first set of rollers crush the whole kernel, and its output is divided three ways: Flour immediately is sent out the mill, grits without a husk proceed to the last roller, and husk, possibly still containing parts of the seed, go to the second set of rollers. From the second roller flour is directly output, as are husks and any possible seed still in them, and the husk-free grits are channeled into the last roller. Five-roller mills are six-roller mills in which one of the rollers performs double duty.

== Gristmill conversion ==
In the 19th century roller mills were adapted to grist mills before replacing them. The mill used either steel or porcelain rollers. Between the years 1865 and 1872, the Hungarian milling industry upgraded and expanded the use of stone mills combined with roller mills in a process known as Hungarian high milling. Hungarian hard wheat so milled was claimed as integral to the "First in the world" success of the Vienna Bakery of the 1867 Paris Exposition.

== Other applications ==
- Specialized for the high production of superfine pyrophyllite powder making in glass fiber industry
- Specialized for the high production of gangue powder making in coal industry
- Specialized for the high production of various of chemical raw material powder making in the chemical industry.

== Working principle ==
A motor or other prime mover drives the hanger of the grinding roller to rotate through a V pulley and center bearing. The roller, which is hung by a bearing and pendulum shaft, will roll along the inner circle of the roll ring while the hanger is rotating. A dust removal blower will generate negative pressure at the inlet and outlet of the grinder to prevent dust and radiating the heat in the machine.

== History ==
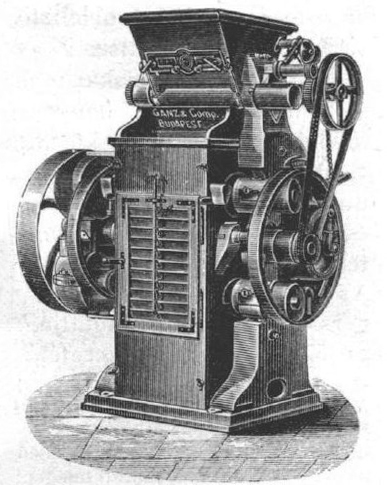
András Mechwart's roller mill (1874)

Roller mills were proposed as early as the 1600s, but practical versions were not implemented until the 1800s. Friedrich Wegmann's 1860s development of porcelain rollers was a notable improvement. Hungarian engineer András Mechwart built off of Wegmann's ideas, developing a design that quickly spread to other parts of Europe and Americas.

== See also ==
- Calender
- impact mill
- unifine mill
- stamp mill
- crusher
- pulverizer
- Vertical roller mill
- ball mill
- Two roll rubber mill
- Roller-milled white enriched flour
