= Whole food =

Minimally processed foods

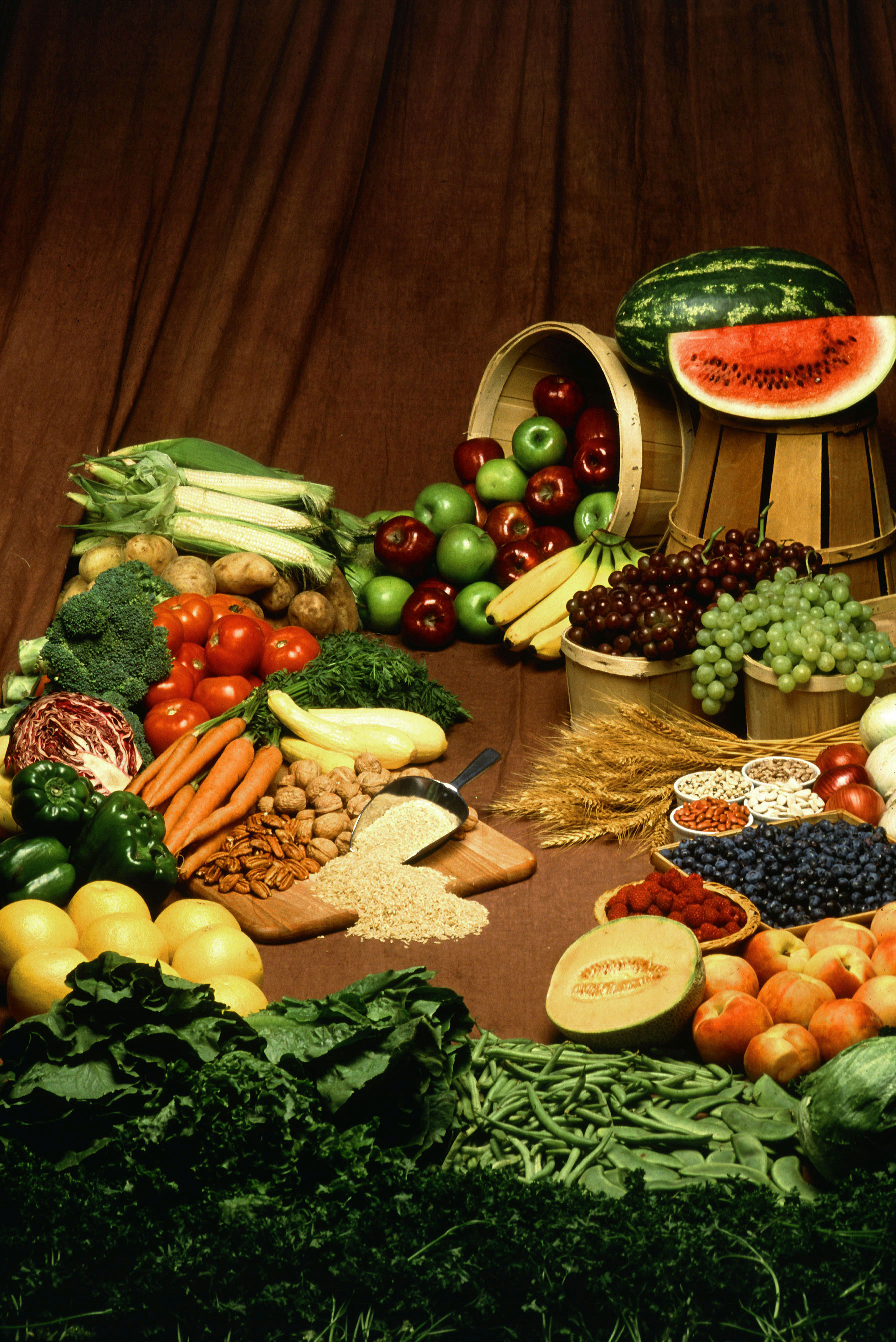

A whole food is a type of food that is not processed or refined, having the least change from its natural state, and contains diverse nutrients.

== Types of whole food ==
Examples of whole foods include grains, fruits, vegetables, dried beans, nuts, seeds, unprocessed meats, and fish.

== Public health advocacy ==
In 2018, unprocessed or minimally processed foods were named as Group 1 of the Nova classification adopted by the Pan American Health Organization of the United Nations.

== Research ==
The Mediterranean diet has been studied as an example of a whole food diet having minimal processing and potential health effects that may include a lower risk of several diseases, such as cardiovascular diseases, childhood obesity, and metabolic syndrome.

== Definition of "natural" ==
The US Food and Drug Administration interprets the term "natural" to indicate that a food contains no artificial or synthetic substances (including color additives from any source) that would not typically be expected in that food. The FDA interpretation does not encompass food production practices, such as the use of pesticides, nor does it explicitly address food processing or manufacturing methods like pasteurization, thermal technologies, or irradiation, and does not define "natural" as having any nutritional or other health benefit.

== See also ==
- List of fruits
- List of vegetables
- Muesli
- Pure Food and Drug Act § History of passage
- Shredded wheat
- Whole Foods Market
- Wholemeal bread
- Whole milk
