= Unifine mill =

Type of flour mill

A Unifine mill is a single one-pass impact milling system which produces ultrafine-milled whole-grain wheat flour that requires no grain pre-treatment and no screening of the flour. Like the grist or stone mills that had dominated the flour industry for centuries, the bran, germ, and endosperm elements of grain are processed into a nutritious whole wheat flour in one step. Consumers had accepted whole wheat products produced by grist or stone mills. The flour produced by these mills was quite coarse as they included the bran and the germ elements of the grain.

As the nutritional value of vitamins, micronutrients, antioxidants, phytonutrients, amino acids, and fiber, were completely or relatively unknown in the late 19th century, removing the bran and the germ with the roller mill, invented at that time, was an attractive idea. With the elimination of the bran and the germ, the resulting "white" flour composed entirely of the endosperm produced an appealing product that research has since proven to be nutritionally deficient: The endosperm contains less than half of the total minerals and B-vitamins of the wheat kernel. Perhaps as significant is the lost total food value since the bran and germ represent 17% of the whole grain, and the process of eliminating the bran and shorts in the roller mill typically yields only 70 to 75% of grain weight as flour product.

== History ==
Development of the Unifine impact (one pass) milling system began in England in the late 1930s. The goal was to develop a simple, holistic system that would pulverize all the elements of the raw material into a fine powder by impacting a high speed flywheel. It was hoped that the resulting flour, made up of smaller particles, would have baking qualities similar to the white, refined flours produced by the roller mills, yet retaining all of the bran, germ and endosperm of the whole grain.

Following World War II, with England focused on rebuilding their shattered infrastructure, the Englishman John Wright eventually made his way to Pullman, Washington. There he succeeded in enlisting engineers at the Division of Industrial Research at Washington State College (now Washington State University) in the project. Following the development of a successful prototype, the milling, baking, and consumer acceptance of Unifine products was studied and funding of the first generation of commercial-grade mills came from a grant from the Washington State Grange. This grant was made possible by a donation by the Secretary of the Washington State Grange, Leonard Fulton, who ultimately went on to operate the first unifine flour mill.

Upon discovering that these mills could not be patented, the college opted to register the name Unifine and authorized Fulton and his Fairfield Milling Company Inc. to begin distribution of the first commercial flour milled by the machine under the brand name Unifine in 1962. A second Unifine Mill began operation under the label Flour Girls in the late 1970s directed and funded by individuals that participated in the research and development of the mills at the college. The flour produced was used by home bakers to make light, whole wheat bread without the dense texture of breads made from traditional whole wheat flours. During that era of simmering consumer interest in the nutritional merits of whole wheat flour, these mills realized modest but ultimately unsustainable success. After roughly twenty years, these companies ceased operations and a new generation of unifine flour mills began producing flour under the Azure Standard brand. These flours are now marketed throughout the greater Pacific Northwestern section of the United States.

== The rise of whole wheat flour ==
Despite historical consumer preference for refined white flour, whole wheat flour products are ascendant largely due to changing consumer attitudes. The Whole Grains Council industry association reports an approximate doubling of the whole wheat flour production from 2003 to 2007. In another visible example, whole wheat bread has reached approximate parity with white bread as measured by slice volume in the United States; as of 2010, whole wheat bread narrowly surpasses white bread as measured by dollar volume. Fortification of white flour whole grains are more nutritious than refined products and wheat is no exception. Whole wheat flour is more nutritious than refined white flour, although through food fortification, some micronutrients are added back to the white flour (required by law in some jurisdictions). Fortified white wheat flour does not, however, contain all of the macronutrients, fiber, antioxidants, phytonutrients, and much of the protein of the wheat's bran and germ. Whole wheat is a good source of calcium, iron, fiber, and other minerals like selenium.

== Industry response ==
Roller mills have adapted to the demand for whole grain products and most commercial whole wheat flour is currently produced using this milling system. In this case, the bran and the germ are further processed and then blended back into the endosperm (white flour) that it was separated from in the first place. While doing so enables the flour mills to use their existing equipment, it is a complex process. The roller mill method usually requires tempering the grain before milling (raising the moisture content); in contrast, dry grain is milled in the case of the Unifine mill, which may account for the suggested decreased rancidity rates reported in Unifine flour.

== Applications ==
The Unifine mill has not proven suitable for grinding harder materials such as gravel, or producing mineral powder for the mining industry or large scale powder-making that the roller mill system dominates. However, in the agricultural industry, where all the nutritional elements of the soft raw materials are desired in the end product, pulverizing it into powder in a single pass by the Unifine Mill has proven to be cost effective and less invasive. In addition to grains, a variety of agricultural products have been efficiently processed using this method including legumes and grapefruit rinds.

== See also ==
- Impact mill
- Ball mill
