= Gristmill =

Apparatus that grinds grain into flour

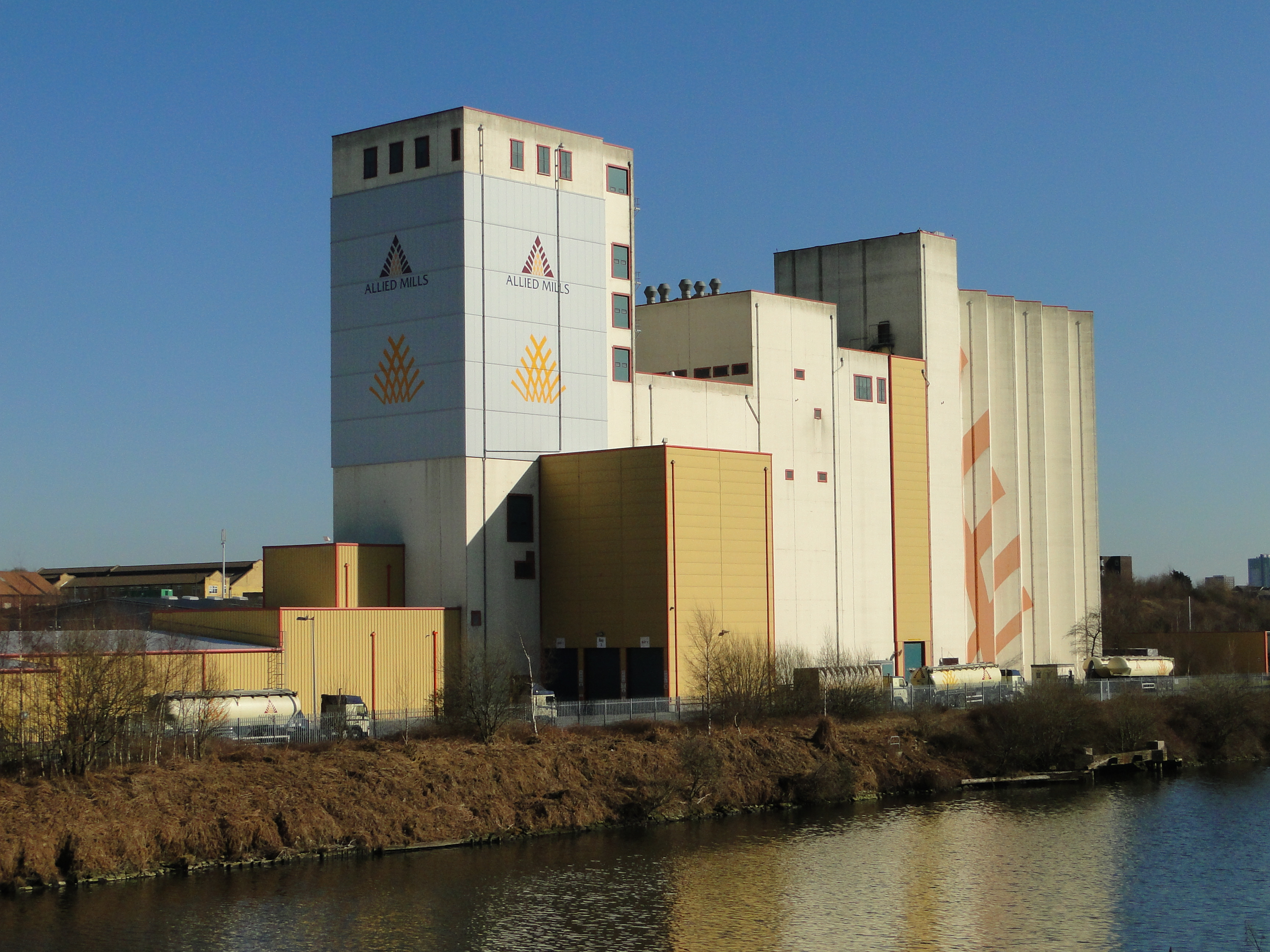
Allied Mills flour mill on the banks of the Manchester Ship Canal in North West England, 2010

A gristmill (also known as a grist mill, corn mill, flour mill, feed mill or feedmill) grinds cereal grain into flour and middlings. The term can refer to either the grinding mechanism or the building that holds it. Grist is grain that has been separated from its chaff in preparation for grinding.

== History ==
=== Early history ===
Senenu Grinding Grain, c. 1352–1336 BC. The royal scribe Senenu appears here bent over a large grinding stone. This unusual sculpture seems to be an elaborate version of a shabti, a funerary figurine placed in the tomb to work in place of the deceased. Brooklyn Museum.

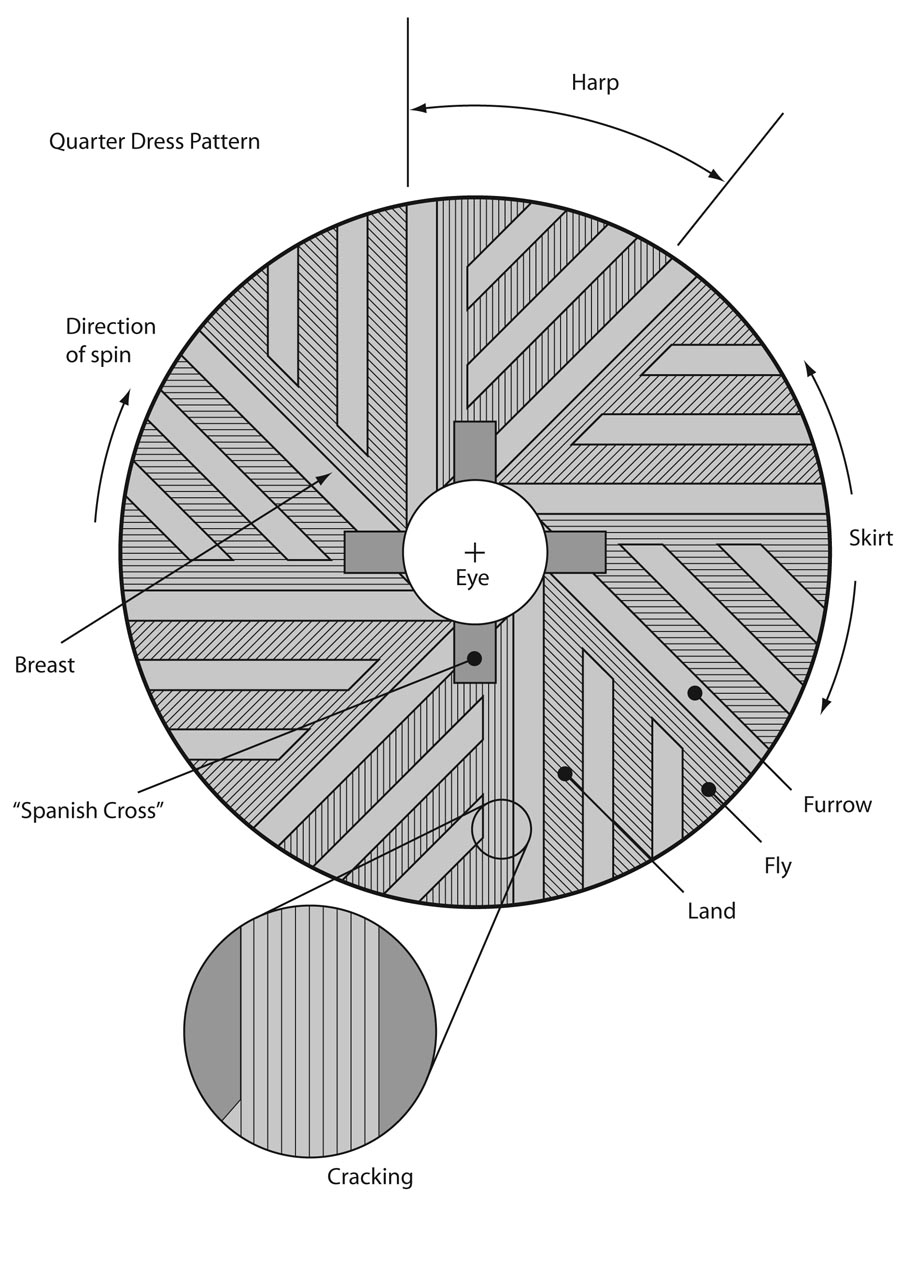
The basic anatomy of a millstone. The diagram depicts a runner stone.

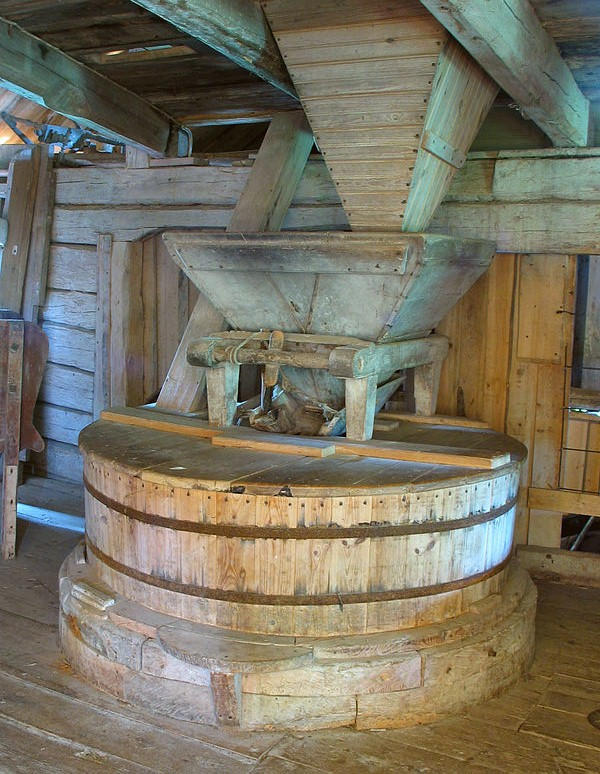
Grinding mechanism in an old Swedish flour mill, 2005

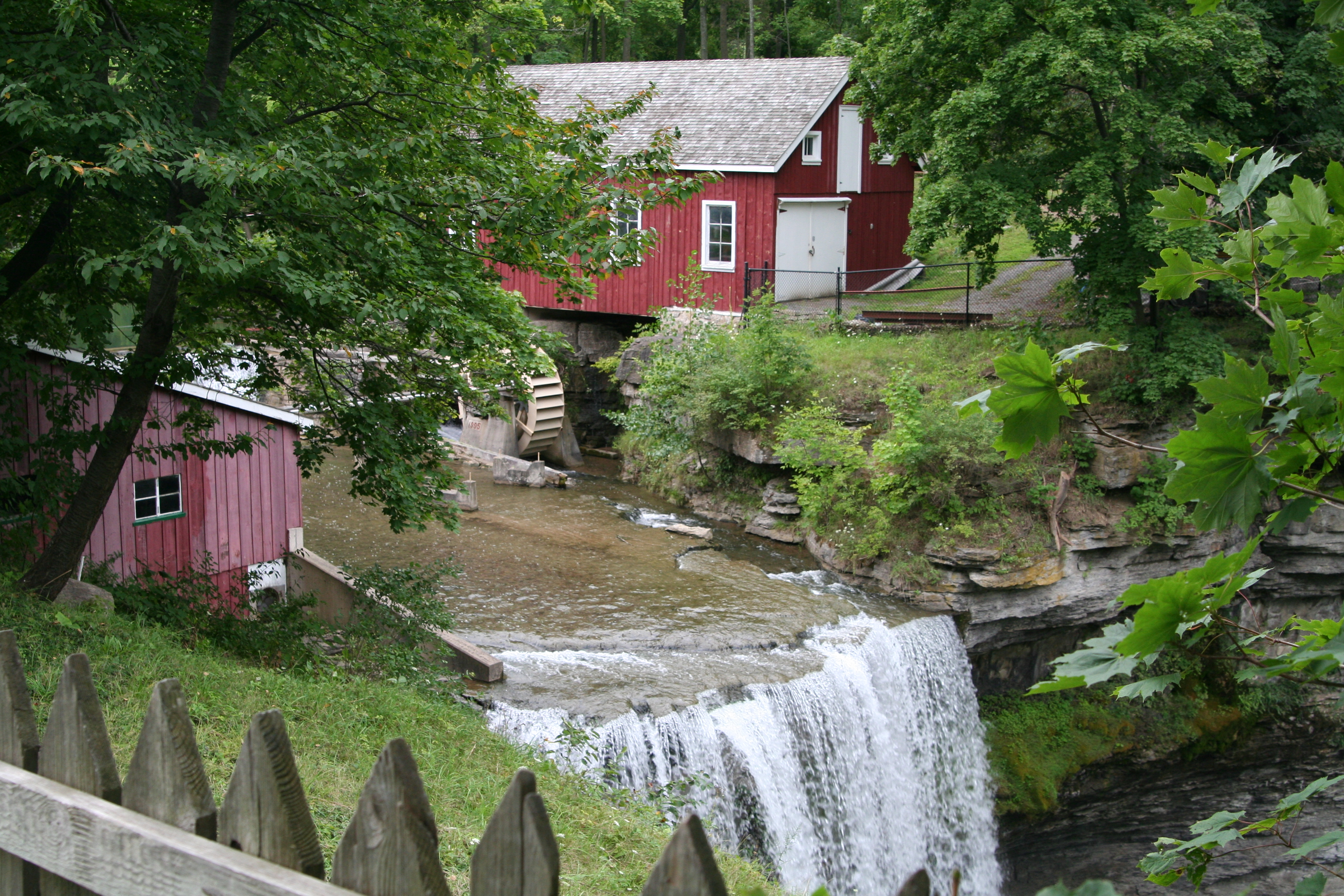
The old water mill at Decew Falls in St. Catharines in Southern Ontario, 2009

The Greek geographer Strabo reported in his Geography that a water-powered grain-mill existed near the palace of king Mithradates VI Eupator at Cabira, Asia Minor, before 71 BC.

The early mills had horizontal paddle wheels, an arrangement which later became known as the "Norse wheel", as many were found in Scandinavia. The paddle wheel was attached to a shaft which was, in turn, attached to the centre of the millstone called the "runner stone". The turning force produced by the water on the paddles was transferred directly to the runner stone, causing it to grind against a stationary "bed", a stone of a similar size and shape. This simple arrangement required no gears, but had the disadvantage that the speed of rotation of the stone was dependent on the volume and flow of water available and was, therefore, only suitable for use in mountainous regions with fast-flowing streams. This dependence on the volume and speed of flow of the water also meant that the speed of rotation of the stone was highly variable and the optimum grinding speed could not always be maintained.

Vertical wheels were in use in the Roman Empire by the end of the first century BC, and these were described by Vitruvius. The rotating mill is considered "one of the greatest discoveries of the human race". It was a very physically demanding job for workers, where the slave workers were considered little different from animals, the miseries of which were depicted in iconography and Apuleius' The Golden Ass. The peak of Roman technology is probably the Barbegal aqueduct and mill where water with a 19-metre fall drove sixteen water wheels, giving a grinding capacity estimated at 28 tons per day. Water mills seem to have remained in use during the post-Roman period.

Manually operated mills utilizing a crank-and-connecting rod were used in the Western Han dynasty.

There was an expansion of grist-milling in the Byzantine Empire and Sassanid Persia from the 3rd century AD onwards, and then the widespread expansion of large-scale factory milling installations across the Islamic world from the 8th century onwards. Geared gristmills were built in the medieval Near East and North Africa, which were used for grinding grain and other seeds to produce meals. Gristmills in the Islamic world were powered by both water and wind. The first wind-powered gristmills were built in the 9th and 10th centuries in what are now Afghanistan, Pakistan and Iran. The Egyptian town of Bilbays had a grain-processing factory that produced an estimated 300 tons of flour and grain per day.

From the late 10th century onwards, there was an expansion of grist-milling in Northern Europe. In England, the Domesday survey of 1086 gives a precise count of England's water-powered flour mills: there were 5,624, or about one for every 300 inhabitants, and this was probably typical throughout western and southern Europe. From this time onward, water wheels began to be used for purposes other than grist milling. In England, the number of mills in operation followed population growth, and peaked at around 17,000 by 1300.

Limited extant examples of gristmills can be found in Europe from the High Middle Ages. An extant well-preserved waterwheel and gristmill on the Ebro River in Spain is associated with the Real Monasterio de Nuestra Senora de Rueda, built by the Cistercian monks in 1202. The Cistercians were known for their use of this technology in Western Europe in the period 1100 to 1350.

=== Classical British and American mills ===
Wayside Inn Grist Mill in Massachusetts, 2014

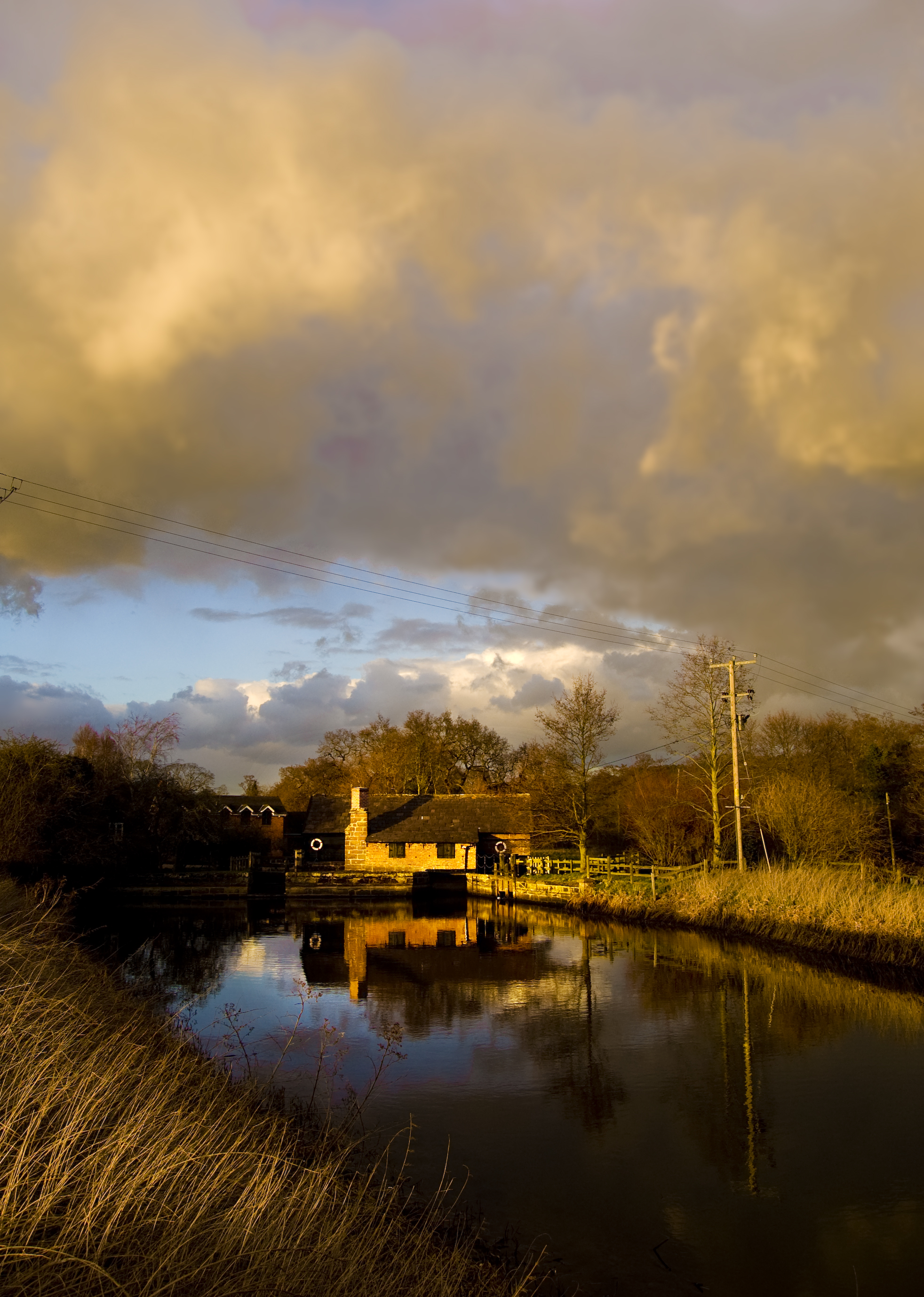
Stretton Watermill, a 17th-century operational mill in Cheshire, England, 2008

Although the terms "gristmill" or "corn mill" can refer to any mill that grinds grain, the terms were used historically for a local mill where farmers brought their own grain and received ground meal or flour, minus a percentage called the "miller's toll". Early mills in England were almost always built by the local lord of the manor and had the exclusive right (the right of mulcture) to a proportion on all grain processed in the community. Later, mills were supported by farming communities and the miller received the "miller's toll" in lieu of wages. Most towns and villages had their own mill so that local farmers could easily transport their grain there to be milled. These communities were dependent on their local mill as bread was a staple part of the diet.

Classical mill designs are usually water-powered, though some are powered by the wind or by livestock. In a watermill a sluice gate is opened to allow water to flow over or under a water wheel to make it turn. In most watermills, the water wheel was mounted vertically, i.e., edge-on, in the water, but in some cases it was aligned horizontally (the tub wheel and so-called Norse wheel). Later designs incorporated horizontal steel or cast iron turbines, which were sometimes refitted into the old wheel mills.

In most wheel-driven mills, a large gear-wheel called the pit wheel is mounted on the same axle as the water wheel and this drives a smaller gear-wheel, the wallower, on a main driveshaft running vertically from the bottom to the top of the building. This system of gearing ensures that the main shaft turns faster than the water wheel, which typically rotates at around 10 rpm.

The millstones themselves turn at around 120 rpm. They are laid one on top of the other. The bottom stone, called the bed, is fixed to the floor, while the top stone, the runner, is mounted on a separate spindle, driven by the main shaft. A wheel called the stone nut connects the runner's spindle to the main shaft, and this can be moved out of the way to disconnect the stone and stop it turning, leaving the main shaft turning to drive other machinery. This might include driving a mechanical sieve to refine the flour, or turning a wooden drum to wind up a chain used to hoist sacks of grain to the top of the mill house. The distance between the stones can be varied to produce the grade of flour required; moving the stones closer together produces finer flour. This process, which may be automatic or controlled by the miller, is called tentering.

The grain is lifted in sacks to the "sack floor" at the top of the mill by a hoist. The sacks are then emptied into bins, from which the grain falls through a hopper to the millstones on the "stone floor" below. The flow of grain is regulated by shaking it in a gently sloping trough (the "slipper") from which it falls into a hole in the center of the runner stone. The milled grain (flour) is collected as it emerges through the grooves in the runner stone from the outer rim of the stones and is fed down a chute to be collected in sacks on the ground or "meal floor". A similar process is used for grains such as wheat, to make flour, and for maize, to make corn meal.

In order to prevent vibrations from the millstones shaking the building apart, the stones were usually placed on a separate timber foundation, known as a husk, which was not attached to the mill walls. That isolated the building from vibrations coming from the stones and the main gearing, and also allowed for easy re-leveling of the foundation to keep the millstones perfectly horizontal. The lower bedstone was placed in an inset in the husk, with the upper runner stone above the level of the husk.

=== The automatic mill ===
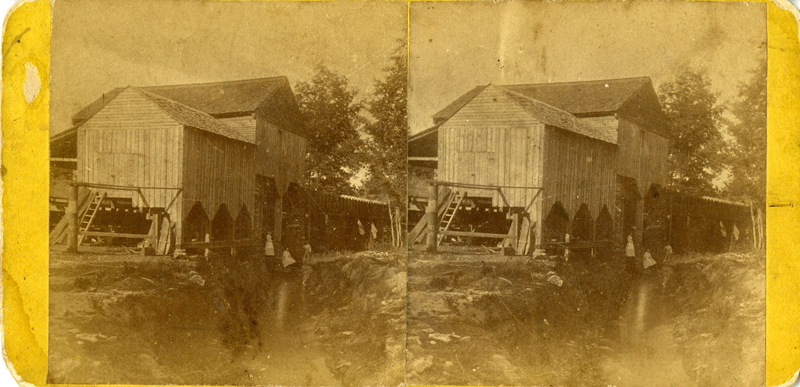
A grist mill, c. 1880

American inventor Oliver Evans revolutionized the labor-intensive process of early mills at the end of the eighteenth century when he automated the process of making flour. His inventions included the Elevator, wood or tin buckets on a vertical endless leather belt, used to move grain and flour vertically upward; the Conveyor, a wooden auger to move material horizontally; the Hopper Boy, a device for stirring and cooling the newly ground flour; the Drill, a horizontal elevator with flaps instead of buckets (similar to the use of a conveyor but easier to build); and the Descender, an endless strap (leather or flannel) in a trough that is angled downward, the strap helps to move the ground flour in the trough. Most importantly, he integrated these into a single continuous process, the overall design later becoming known as the Automatic (or Automated) mill. In 1790 he received the third Federal patent for his process. In 1795 he published "The Young Mill-Wright and Miller's Guide" which fully described the process.

Evans himself did not use the term gristmill to describe his automatic flour mill, which was purpose designed as a merchant mill (he used the more general term "water-mill"). In his book his only reference to "grist" (or "grists") is to the small batches of grain a farmer would bring in to have ground for himself (what would be generally called barter or custom milling). In his book, Evans describes a system that allows the sequential milling of these grists, noting that "a mill, thus constructed, might grind grists in the day time, and do merchant-work at night." Over time, any small, older style flour mill became generally known as a gristmill (as a distinction from large factory flour mills).

== Modern mills ==
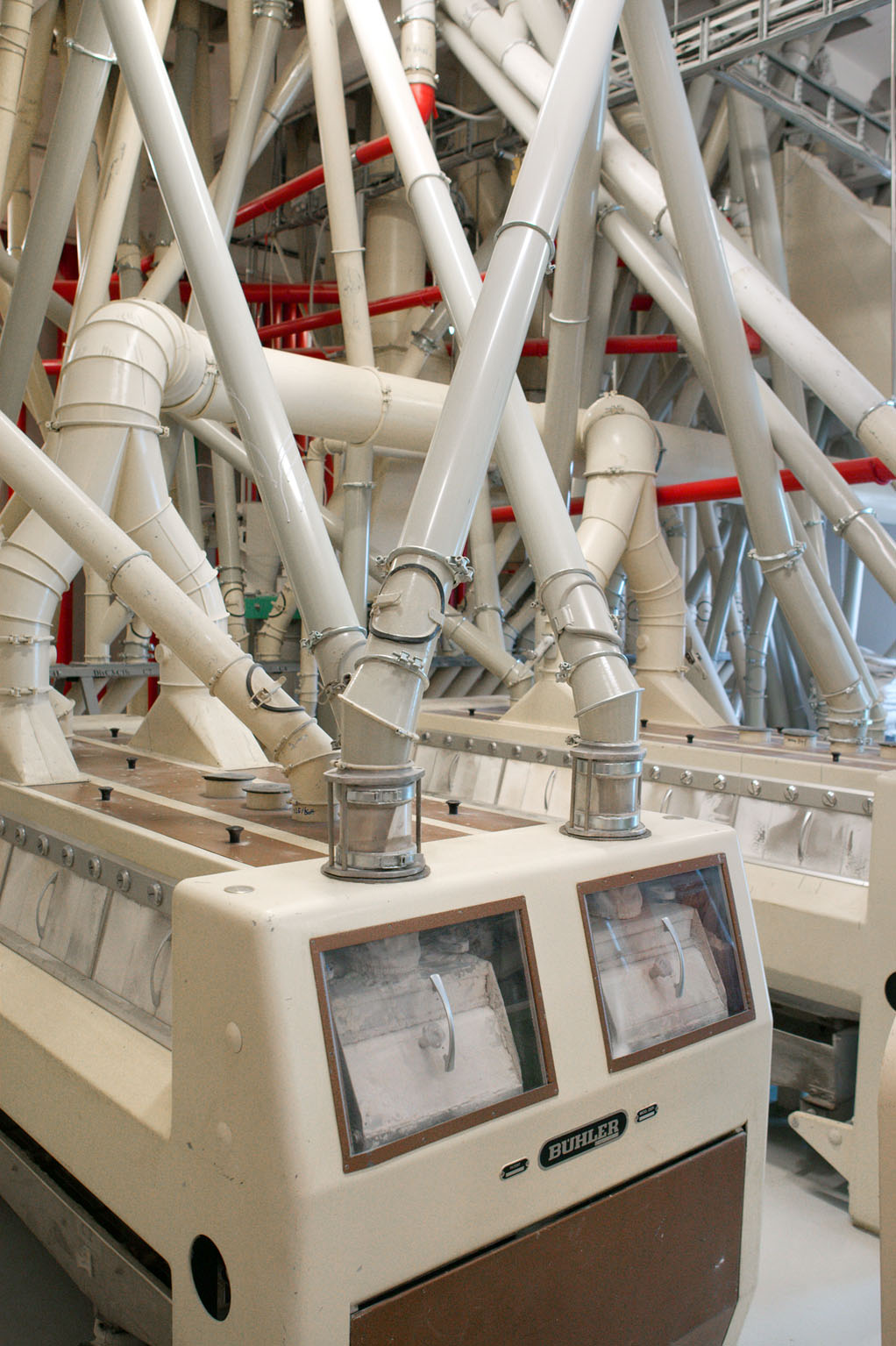
Interior in Tartu Mill, the largest grain milling company in the Baltic states

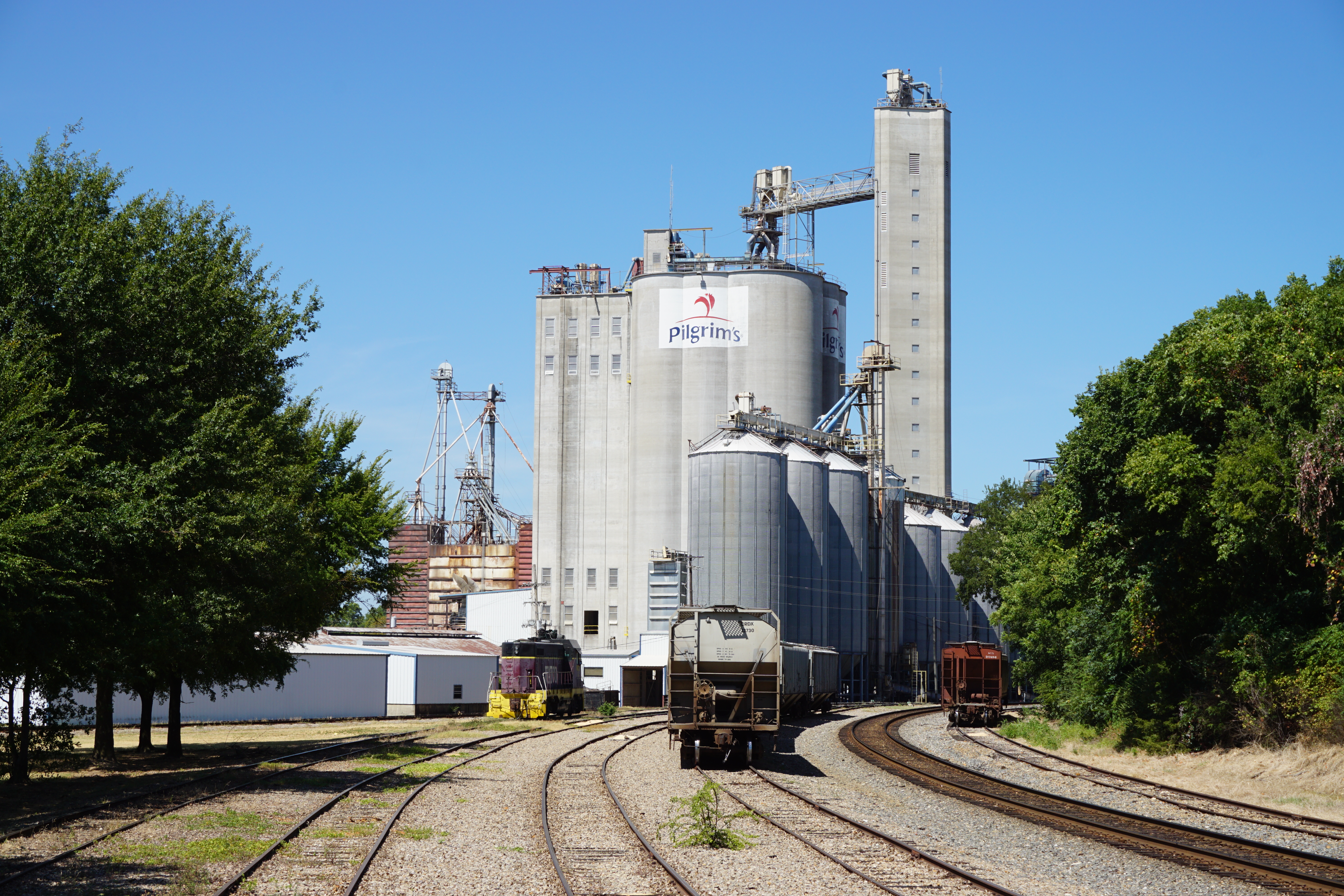
Pilgrim's Pride feed mill in Pittsburg, Texas, August 2015

Modern mills typically use electricity or fossil fuels to spin heavy steel, or cast iron, serrated and flat rollers to separate the bran and germ from the endosperm. The endosperm is ground to create white flour, which may be recombined with the bran and germ to create whole grain or graham flour. The different milling techniques produce visibly different results, but can be made to produce nutritionally and functionally equivalent output. Stone-ground flour is preferred by many bakers and natural food advocates because of its texture, nutty flavour, and the belief that it is nutritionally superior and has a better baking quality than steel-roller-milled flour. It is claimed that, as the stones grind relatively slowly, the wheat germ is not exposed to the sort of excessive temperatures that could cause the fat from the germ portion to oxidize and become rancid, which would destroy some of the vitamin content. Stone-milled flour has been found to be relatively high in thiamin, compared to roller-milled flour, especially when milled from hard wheat.

Gristmills only grind "clean" grains from which stalks and chaff have previously been removed, but historically some mills also housed equipment for threshing, sorting, and cleaning prior to grinding.

Modern mills are usually "merchant mills" that are either privately owned and accept money or trade for milling grains or are owned by corporations that buy unmilled grain and then own the flour produced.

== Pests ==
One common pest found in flour mills is the Mediterranean flour moth. Moth larvae produce a web-like material that clogs machinery, sometimes causing grain mills to shut down.

== Gallery ==
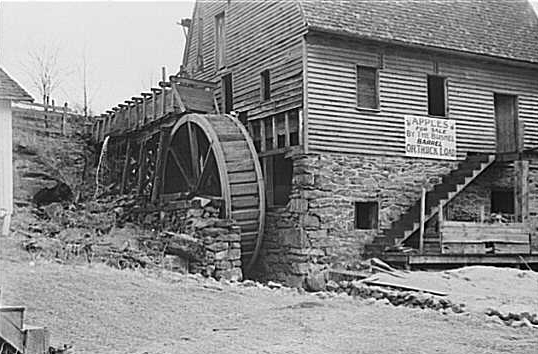
Gristmill with overshot water wheel, Skyline Drive, Virginia, 1938

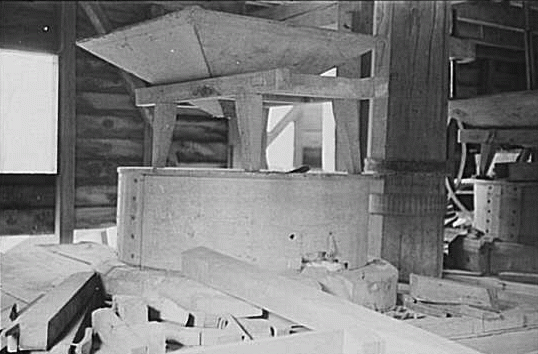
Gristmill hopper, Skyline Drive, Virginia, 1938. Grain was funneled through the hopper to a grinding stone below.

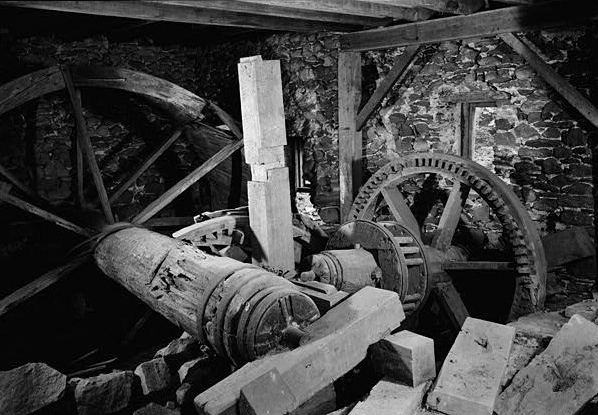
Gristmill drive machinery, Thomas Mill, Chester County, Pennsylvania

Pedal powered wheat mill, Shediac Cape, New Brunswick

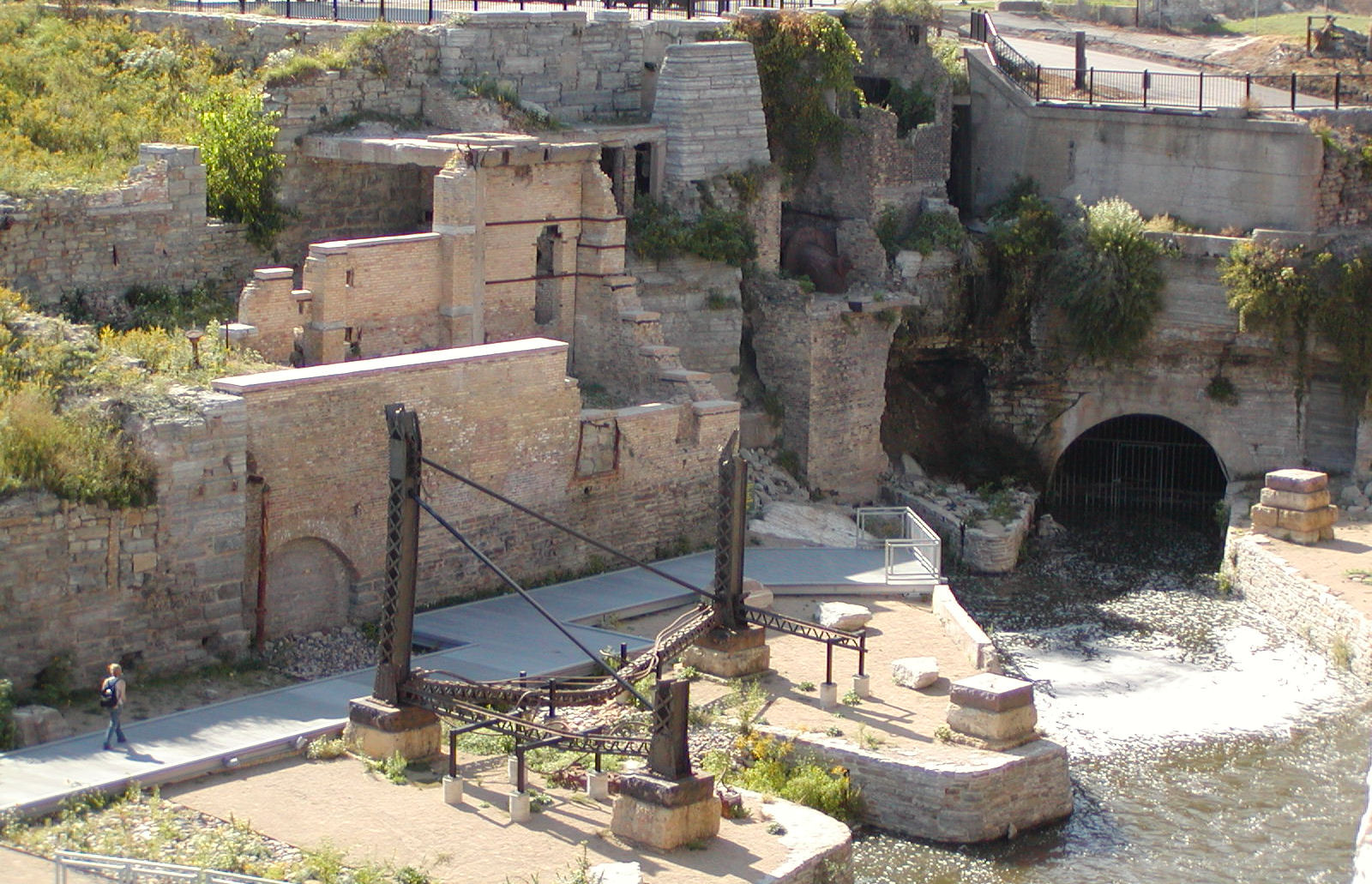
Remnants of some of the scores of flour mills built in Minneapolis between 1850 and 1900. Note the underground Mill race that powered mills on the west side of the Mississippi River at St. Anthony Falls.

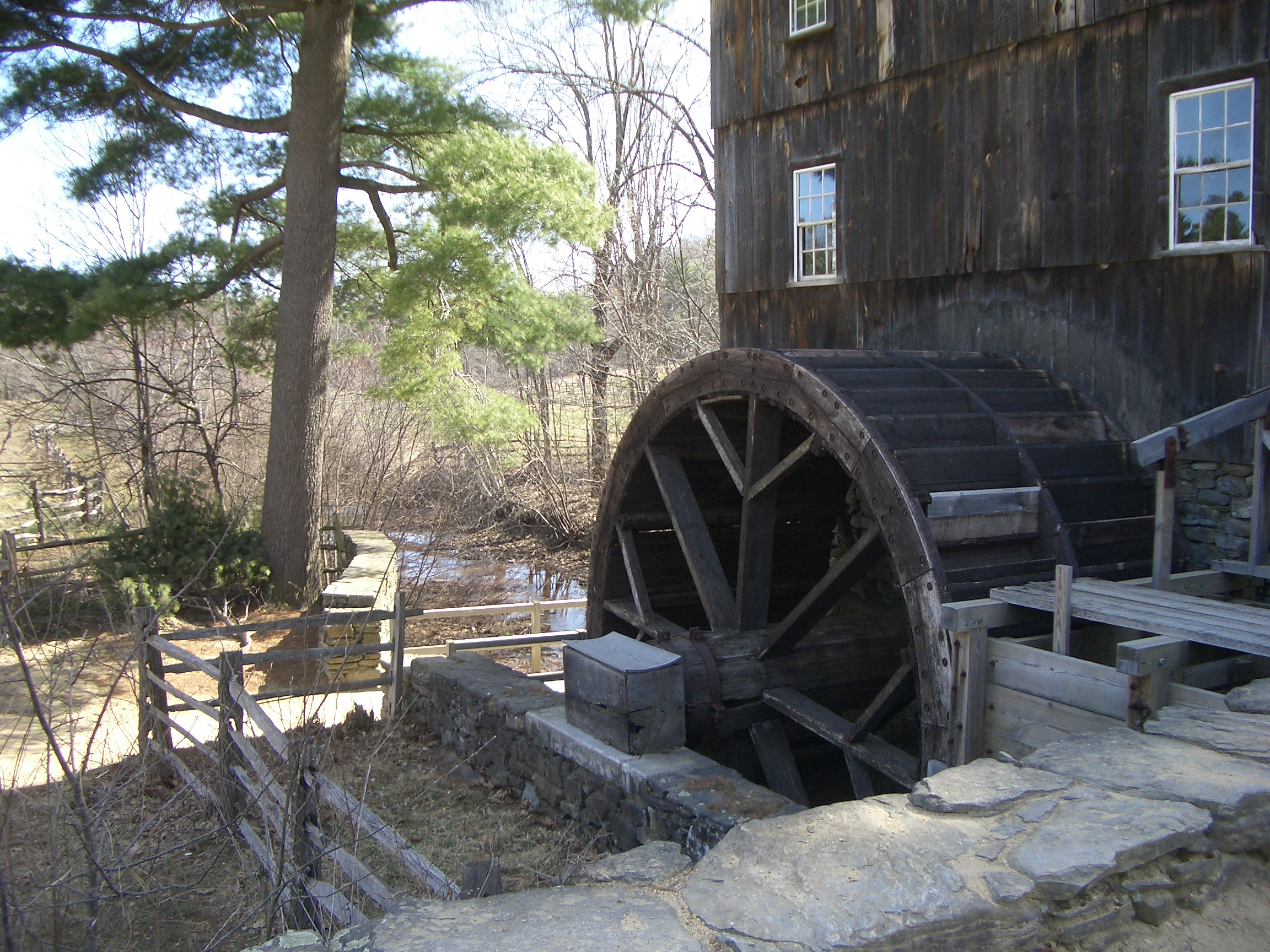
Wheel of the 1840s-era Grist Mill at Old Sturbridge Village in Sturbridge, Massachusetts

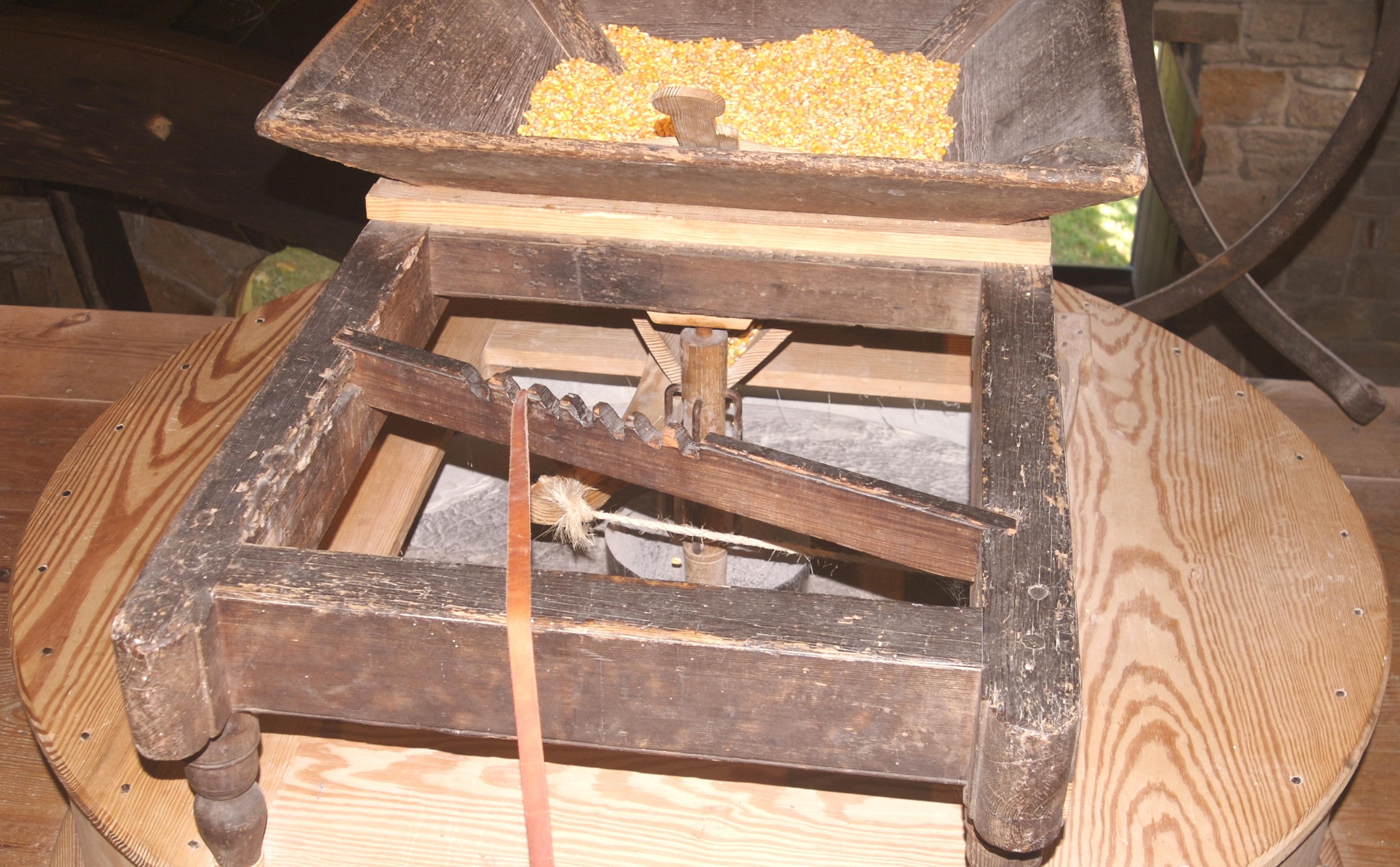
"Slipper" feeding corn into the grindstones of George Washington's Gristmill

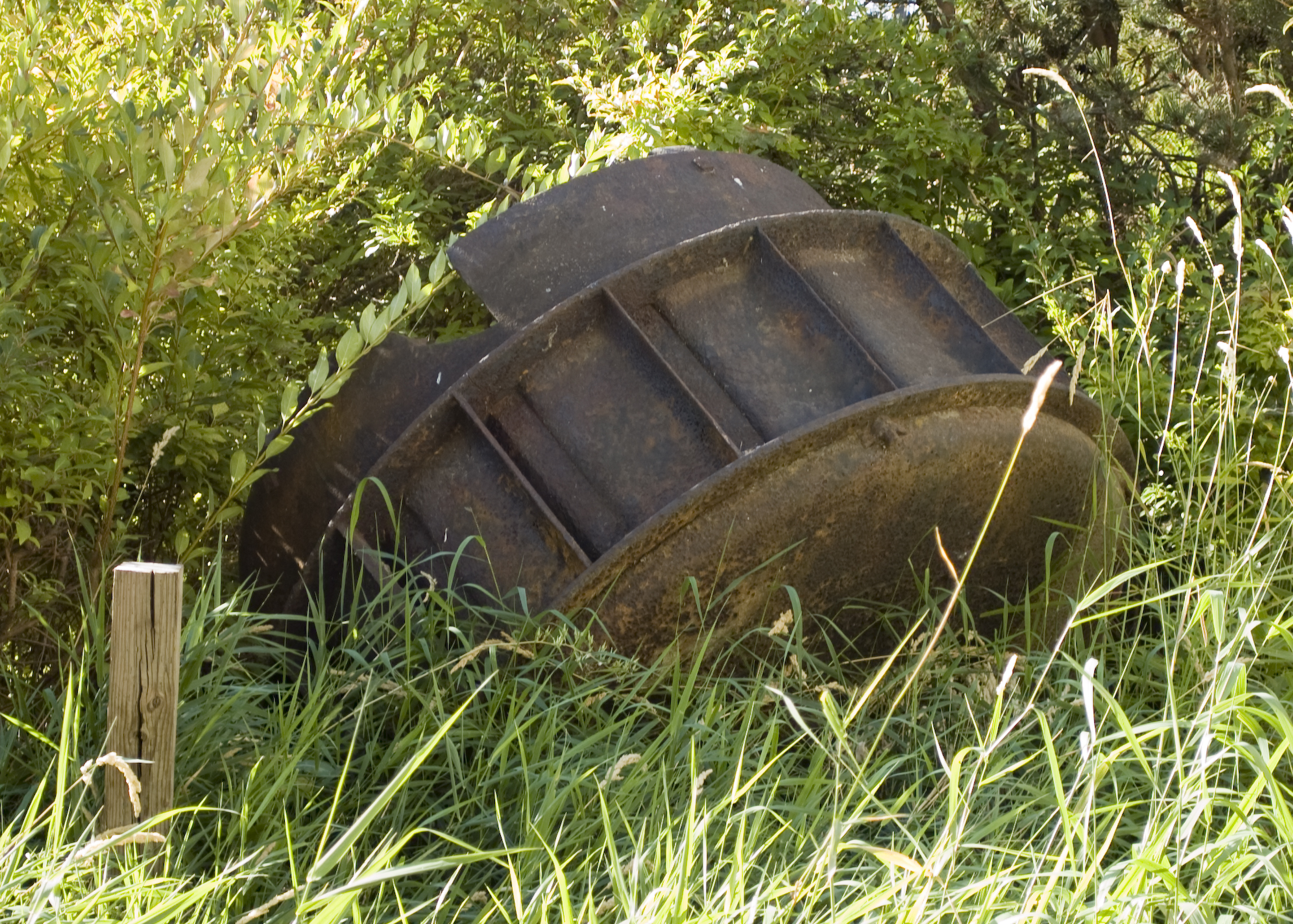
Old turbine wheel at the old grist mill in Thorp, Washington

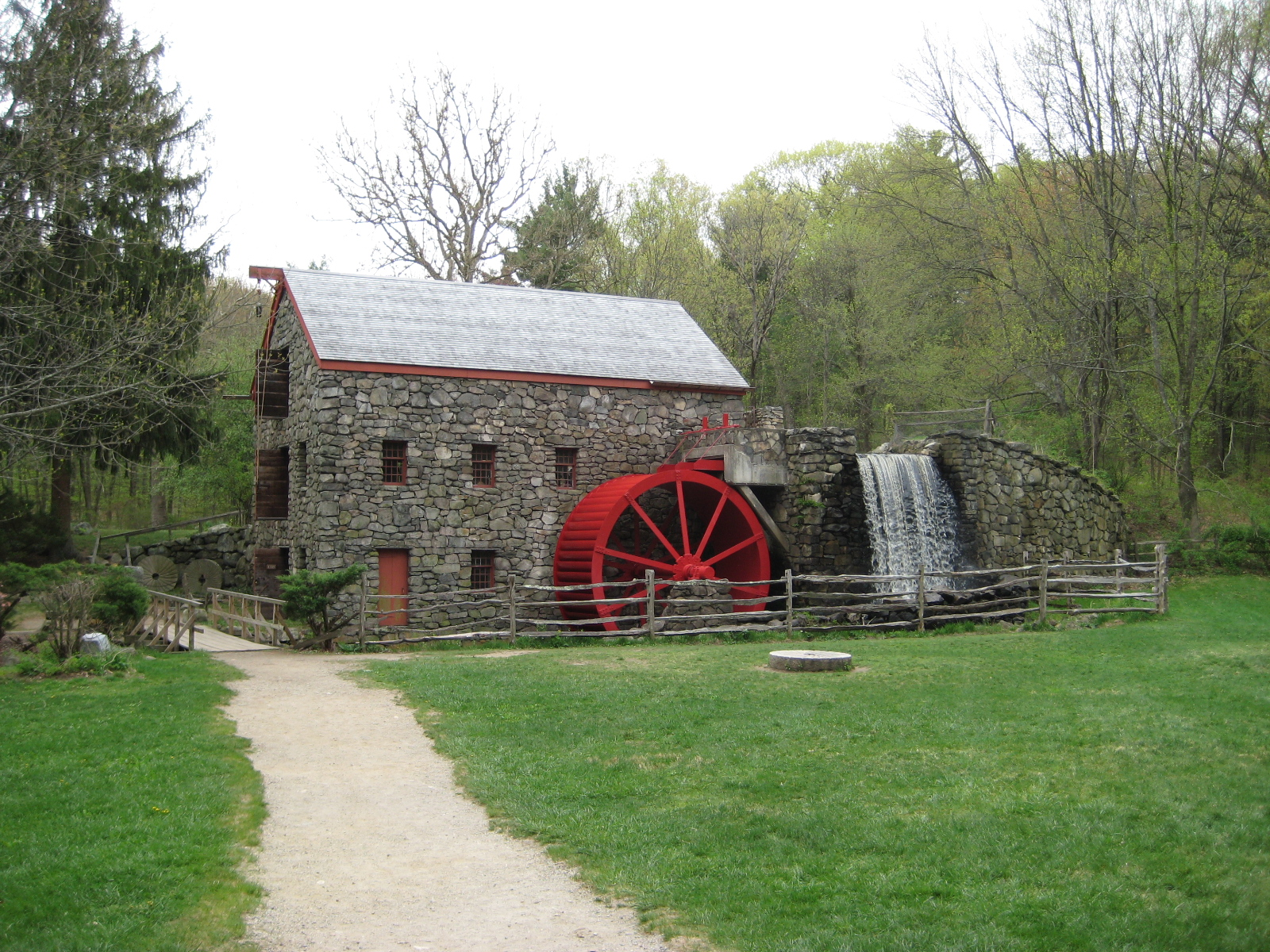
The grist mill at the Wayside Inn in Sudbury, Massachusetts

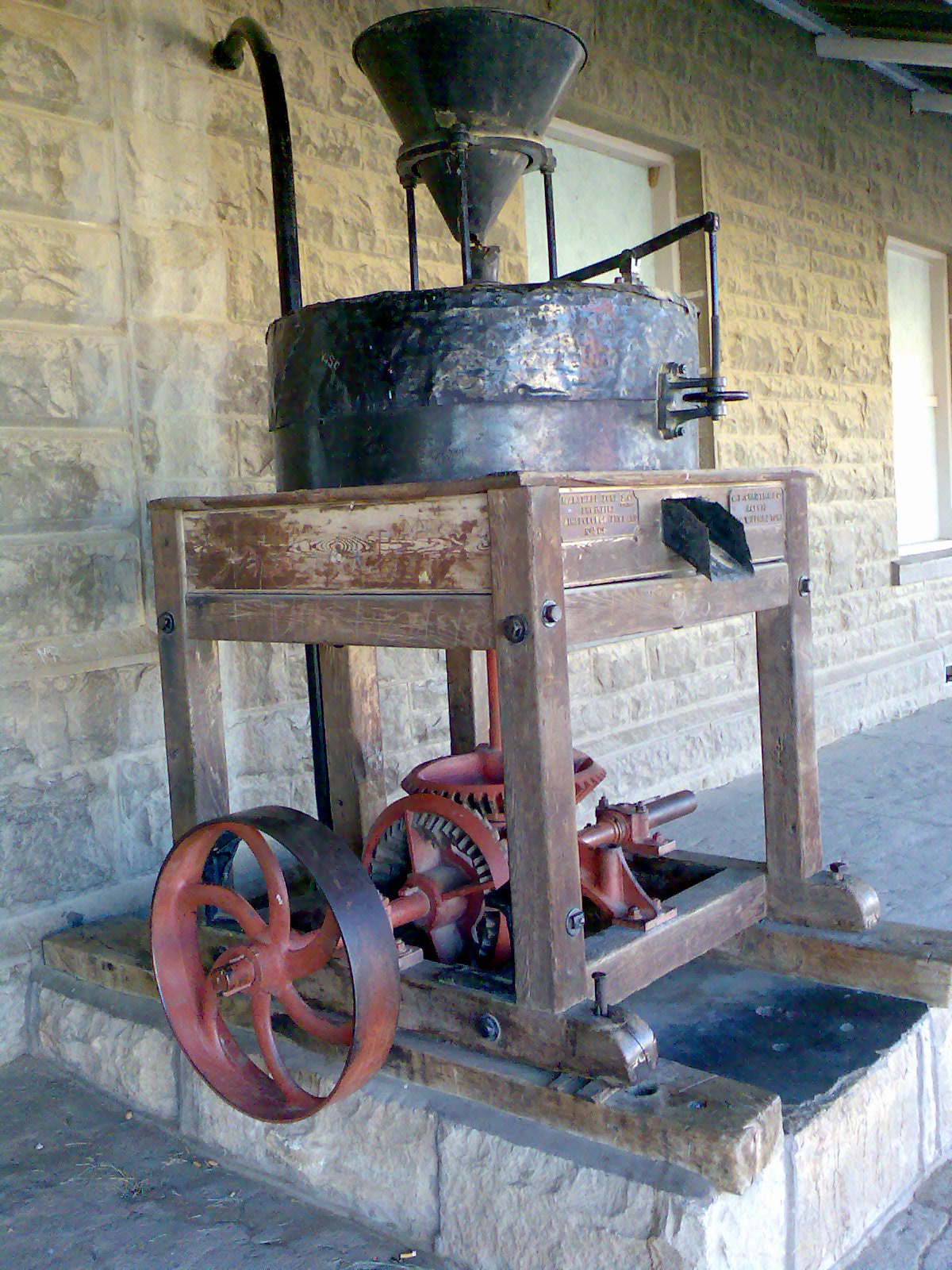
Grain mill with bevel gears outside local museum at Dordrecht

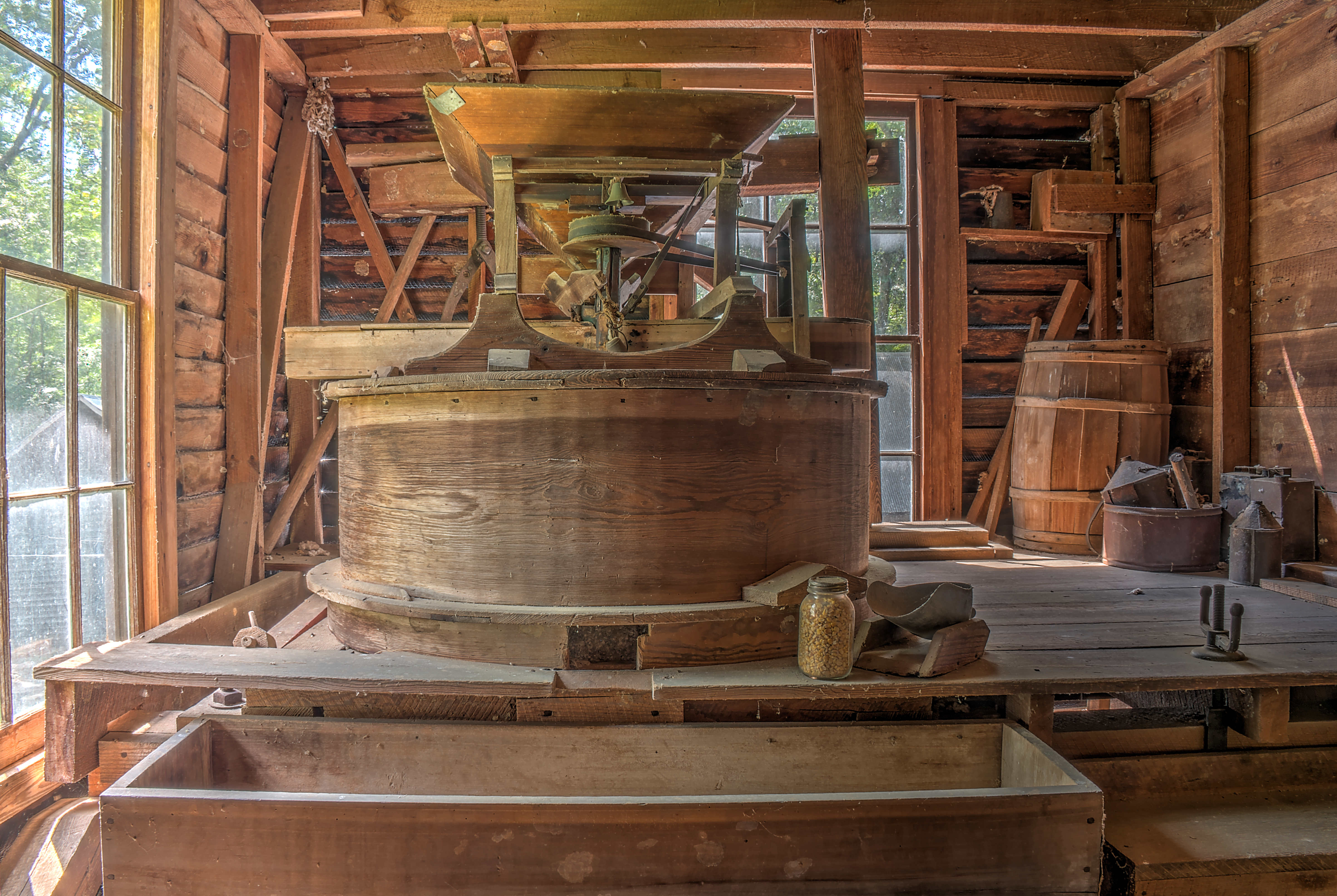
Grist mill at Jarrell Plantation, acquired 1899

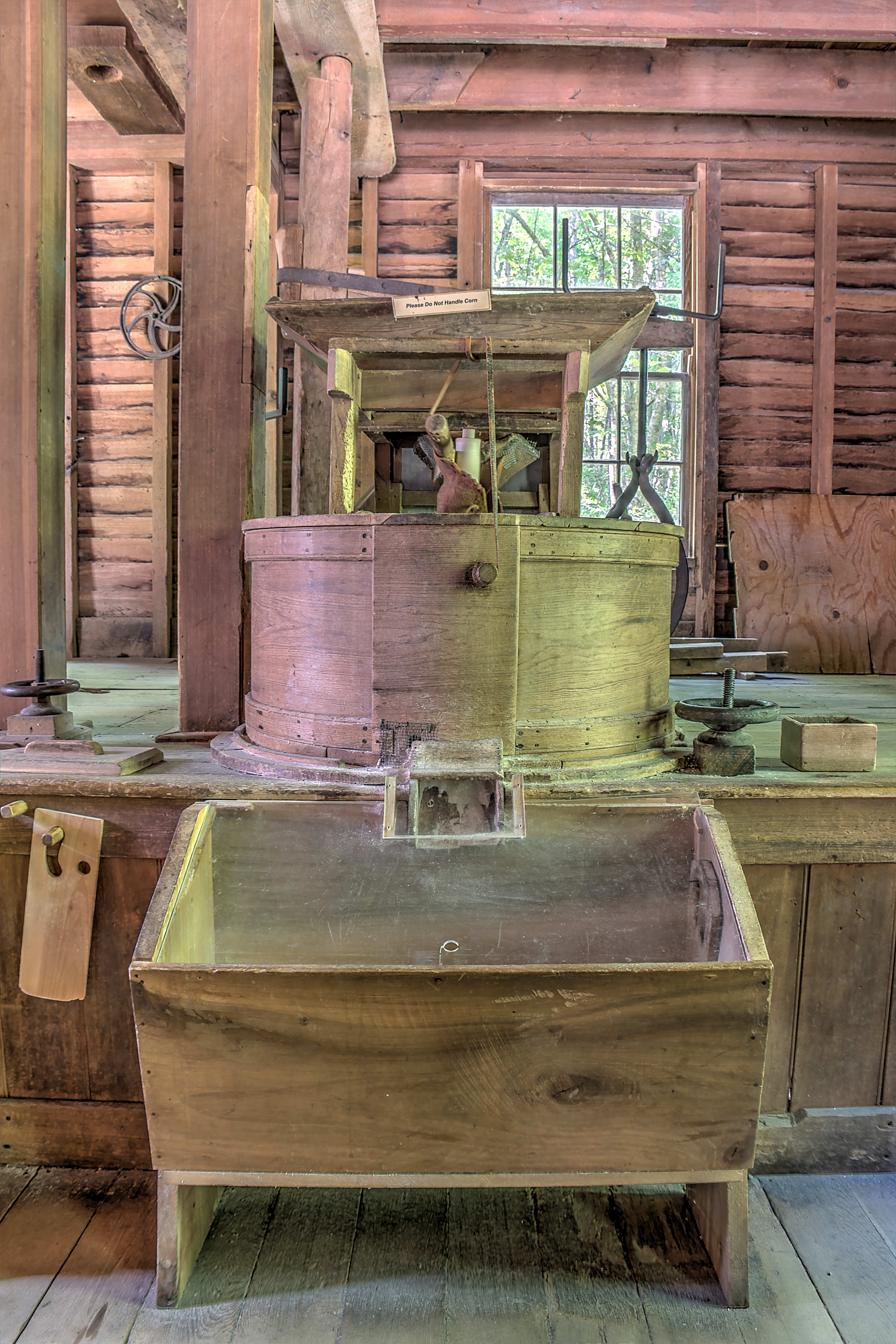
Water-powered corn mill at Mingus Mill

== See also ==
- List of watermills
- Hammermill
- Tide mill
- Unifine mill
- Ship mill
- Windmill
- Chondrometer
