= Whole wheat bread =

Bread made of flour milled from wheat grains

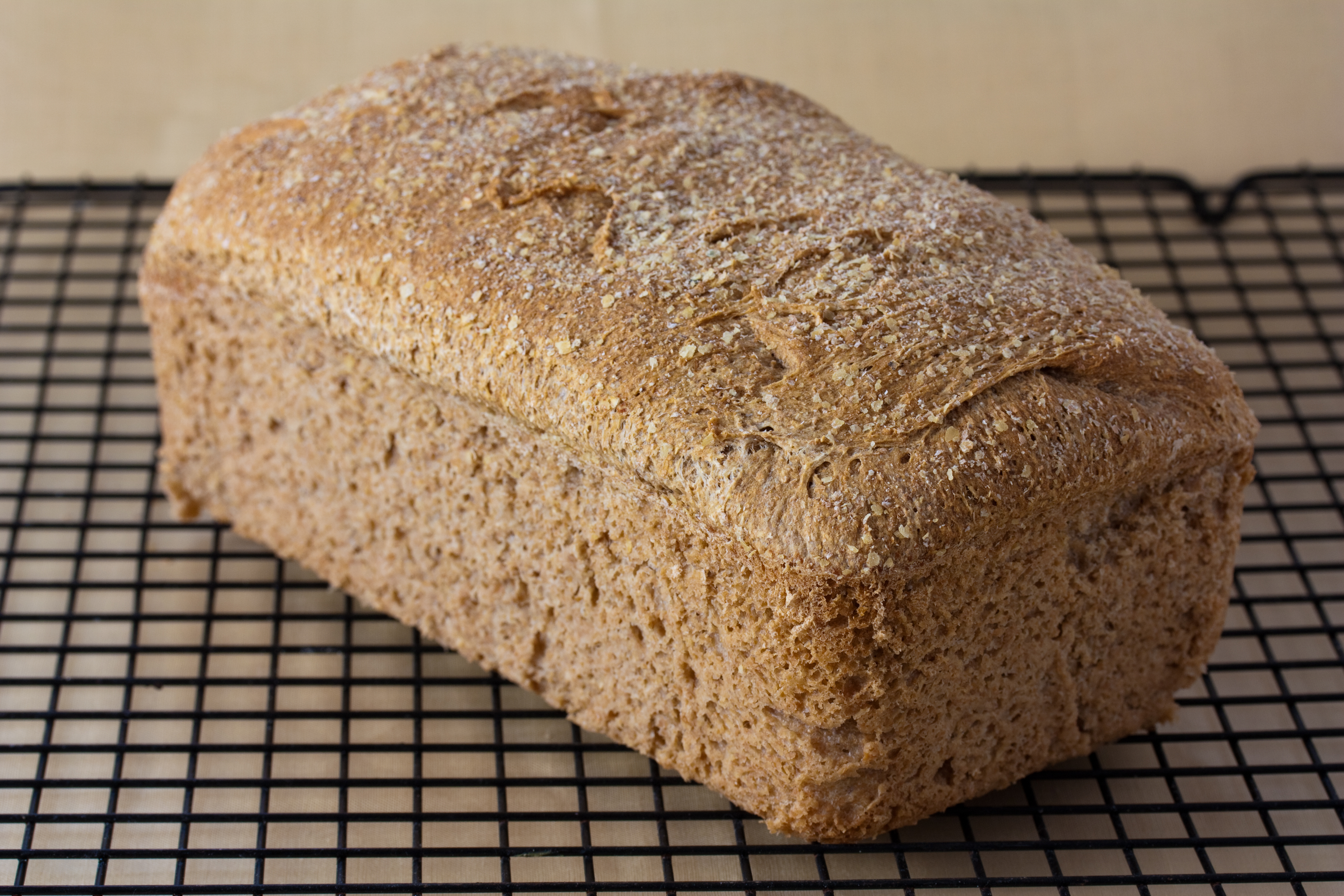

Whole wheat bread or wholemeal bread is a type of bread made using flour that is partly or entirely milled from whole or almost-whole wheat grains, see whole-wheat flour and whole grain. It is one kind of brown bread. Synonyms or near-synonyms for whole-wheat bread outside the United States (e.g., the UK) are whole grain bread or wholemeal bread. Some regions of the US simply called the bread wheat bread, a comparison to white bread. Some whole-wheat loaves are traditionally coated with whole or cracked grains of wheat (illustrated below), for cosmetic rather than nutritional reasons.

== Etymology ==
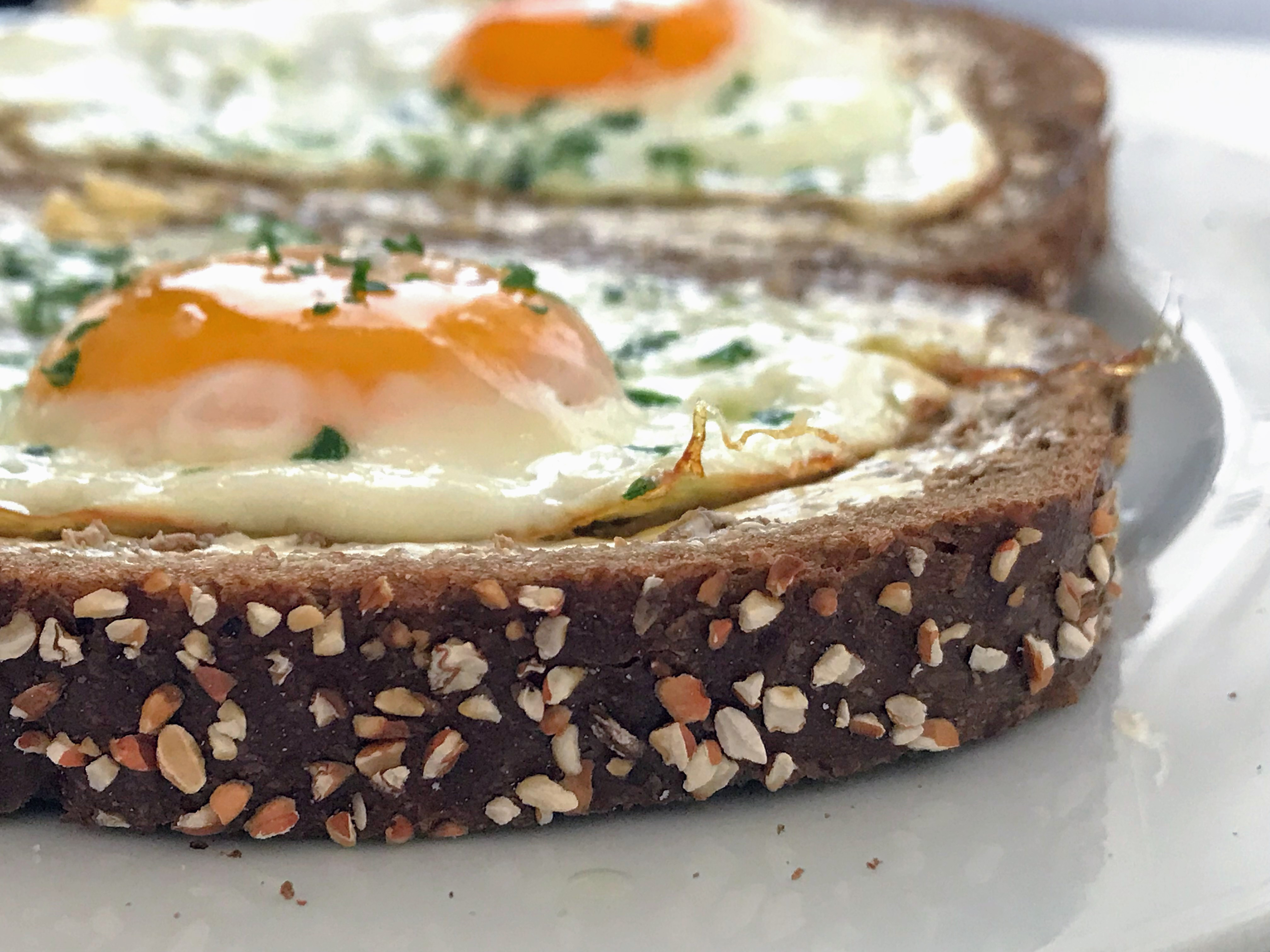
Whole wheat bread served with butter and eggs

Meal in the sense of "flour" is derived from Old English melu and is cognate with modern English "mill", and with Dutch meel (flour), German Mehl (flour) and Old Norse mjǫl (flour).

== Overview ==
The exact composition of products legally marketable as "whole wheat bread" varies from country to country and even within one country. In some cases, the bread is made with whole-grain flour that contains all of the component parts of the grain in the same ratios as they occur in nature, whereas in other cases the bread may include only representative amounts of bran or wheat germ. In Canada, for example, a proportion of the wheat germ may be removed from the flour to reduce the risk of rancidity, but the term "whole-wheat bread" is still used.

In the United States the term "wheat bread" is sometimes used as a marketing tactic to give the impression of a product being whole-wheat bread, but this is at best an ambiguous term and potentially deceptive because most white bread is made from wheat flour, and thus could legitimately be called "wheat bread". The majority of what is marketed in the US under the name "wheat bread" has very little whole grain content, and is made primarily of white flour, with caramel coloring added to them to give an illusion of a higher whole wheat content.

In the UK bread labelled or advertised as 'wholemeal' must contain 100% wholemeal flour, and 'wheat germ' must have at least 10% added processed wheat germ. Most flour in the UK, and consequently breads made with it, is required to be fortified with added calcium, iron, thiamine (Vitamin B1) and niacin (Vitamin B3); wholemeal flour is exempt as it inherently contains sufficient of these nutrients. The unregulated term "wheatmeal" is used to describe flour containing some but not all of the outer covering and central part of the wheat grain.

== See also ==
- Graham bread – an early reintroduction of a type of whole grain wheat bread
- Horsebread – a very unrefined bread of medieval Europe
- Kneippbrød – the most popular bread in Norway
- Sprouted bread – a form of whole grain bread where the grains have been sprouted to increase their nutritional levels
- Unifine Mill
