= Roller-milled white enriched flour =

The roller mill was created by Hungarian bakers in the late 1860s and its popularity spread worldwide throughout the 1900s. Roller mills now produce almost all non-whole-grain flour. Enriched flour is flour that meets an FDA standard in the United States. Roller-milled white enriched flour makes up over 90% of the flour that comes out of the United States.

== Significance of the roller mill ==
In 2017, well over 90% of the United States' commercial flour production was not whole-grain. Virtually all of this non-whole-grain flour was produced on flour roller mills. These mills were first developed in Europe in the 1860s, soon after were patented and introduced into the United States and quickly came to dominate the world's flour milling industry as they continue to do today.

Flour roller mills were specifically designed to efficiently separate the bran and germ elements of the wheat kernel. What remains is the endosperm, generally referred to as white flour. White flour is often artificially enriched to restore some of the nutrition lost by separating out the bran and the germ elements. In the U.S., white flour is nearly always artificially enriched. Enrichment rules vary among countries.

== Overview of the wheat kernel ==
Wheat and other grains grow on a stalk and have an outer covering known as the husk, or the hull, which is not nutritional to humans. When the hull is removed, it is often referred to as chaff. The edible part of the wheat kernel is a wheat berry composed of the bran (about 14% of the kernel volume), the germ (about 3% of the kernel volume), and the endosperm (about 83% of the kernel volume).

The wheat berries' outer protective shell is the bran. The bran is rich in dietary fiber and fatty acids, and contains significant quantities of starch, protein, vitamins, and minerals. The germ is a source of several nutrients, including vitamin E, folate, phosphorus, thiamin, zinc, and magnesium, as well as fatty acids and fatty alcohols. The germ is also a source of fiber. The endosperm's natural purpose (like all fruits) is to give nutrition to the germ in the form of starch when the seed is planted in the soil and sprouts into a plant. It also contains some oils and protein.

== Background of the invention ==
In early America, flour mills used mill stones that were set close together and turned at high speed, crushing all the components of the wheat kernel into an indiscriminate flour. This was generally referred to as low milling. At the time, without refrigeration or sealed storage, the heightened water absorption properties of the crushed bran fiber and the oil-rich germ shortened the shelf life of this flour. It was also more attractive to insects and vermin. Sifting or bolting could separate some of the elements because the thicker bran seed coat of the soft winter wheat varieties would crack into relatively large fragments. In this era, the limited amount of endosperm that could be sifted into a whiter flour was understandably preferred by consumers.

Stone milled soft white wheat, which is lower in protein, dominated United States production before the introduction of Red Fife hard red spring wheat in the 1860s and Turkey hard red winter wheat in the 1870s. The higher gluten and protein properties of these hard wheats offered better bread-making qualities than the soft wheat varieties. U.S. commercial millers initially significantly discounted the hard wheats because the white endosperm that customers preferred could be more easily sifted from the soft wheats.

However, millers worldwide began to experiment with high grinding, or placing the mill stones further apart and turning them at slower speeds. The process was to first crack the wheat kernel and then to extract the flour by a succession of grindings and siftings. The white endosperm flour yield was enhanced by the addition of device known as the middlings purifier, which sent a blast of air into the mixture of partially-ground kernels as they were being sifted, lifting the bran particles upward into a separate holding area. A patent was granted to George Christian for this device, and the consistent output of high quality flour thus became known as patent flour. However, the use of mill stones in this high grinding process soon proved not to be optimum.

== The invention of the roller mill ==
The improved functionality of baked products made with a finer flour mixture first got international attention at the 1867 Paris International Exposition. The Hungarian baking exhibitors clearly out performed their French counterparts. They credited the finer flour that Hungarian millers were able to produce by using more uniform steel rollers instead of mill stones for their higher quality baked goods. The notoriety of their flour was the motivation for staging the 1873 Vienna International Exhibition held to promote the merits of this new technology. A US Patent number 225,770: Grain-Crushing Roll employing the use of grooved steel rollers geared to mill at different speeds was later granted in the U.S.in 1880 to John Steven . The obvious efficiency of the roller mill prompted adoption over the next decade and came to dominate the commercial flour industry. No all-millstone mills of any significance were built in the U.S. after that with the commercial flour grindstone virtually disappearing from the flour milling scene in all developed countries by the early 1900s.

To enhance output, millers experimented with flour tempering, or hydrating the outer shell of the wheat berry, which facilitates the elimination of the bran and the germ. This is now a key step in the roller milling production of white endosperm flour. In contrast, whole grain milling systems that process the entire wheat kernel in one pass keep the grain as dry as possible. In 2017, these "single stream" systems actually produced a modest amount of the whole grain flour that was commercially milled. Most of the commercial whole grain flour produced is reconstituted or recombined after first being separated by roller mills.

== Flour enrichment ==
In the 1930s and 1940s, specific deficiency disease syndromes were first identified and documented in the United States. In order to improve the nutritional status of the population, in 1941 the FDA established a standard of identity for any flour labeled as enriched. These standards have been amended over the years, but they continue as the basis for the addition of thiamine, niacin, riboflavin, folic acid, and iron, with the addition of calcium as optional. Under this regulation, fortification of flour and bread products is not mandatory, but if a product is labeled as enriched, it must meet the standards of identity described in the FDA regulations. The National Labeling Education Act of 1990 provided for federal preemption of standards of identity, nullifying any state laws that made enrichment of flour and bread products mandatory.
