= Whole Grain Stamp =

- Whole Grain Stamps

The Whole Grain Stamp was created by the Whole Grains Council and a panel of scientific and culinary advisors in January 2005 as a visual marker to signal products that contain dietarily-significant amounts of whole grains. The Stamp features a stylized sheaf of grain on a golden-yellow background with a black border.

Every product that bears the "Basic Stamp" must contain at least 8 grams of whole grain per serving. 8 grams equals one half of a MyPyramid serving. Products that bear the "100% Whole Grain Stamp" contain at least 16 grams of whole grain per serving – or a full MyPyramid serving as outlined by the U.S. Department of Agriculture – and do not contain any refined grains.

The 2005 Dietary Guidelines for Americans recommend that everyone over age 9 should eat at least three servings of whole grains each day for health. For an outline of scientific studies published on the health benefits of whole grains, see resources below. In 1999, the U.S. Food and Drug Administration (FDA) authorized the use of a health claim that can be used on whole grain foods: "Diets rich in whole grain foods and other plant foods, and low in saturated fat and cholesterol, may help reduce the risk of heart disease." However, these claims have certain limitations, and cannot be used on some whole grain foods even if the foods are 100% whole grain.

== Resources ==
- Whole Grains Education Materials
- Whole Grain Stamp
