= Chondrometer =

Instrument for measuring the bulk density of grain

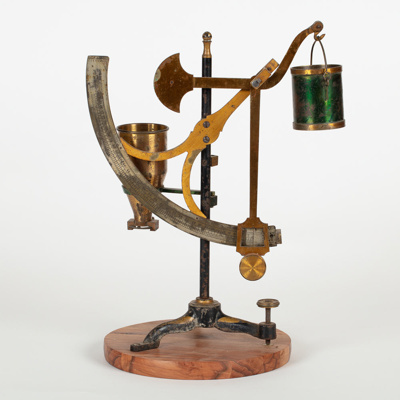
Chondrometer at Otautau Museum

A chondrometer is a measuring instrument designed to determine the bulk density of grain. Grain density is measured in kilograms per hectolitre (Imp. pounds per bushel). It is thus also referred to as the hectolitre mass.

== Purpose ==
Density is a guide to wheat quality and determines the price and the space required to store and transport the crop.

== Description ==
A chondrometer consists of a filling hopper, a measuring container, a straightedge, a weighing instrument. The filling hopper allows the grain to fall into the measuring container in a reproducible pattern as several measurements are taken, and all readings need to be within a strict degree of accuracy. The measuring cylinder has flat top edge to it can levelled using the straightedge (a strickle) to give a set volume. Today, the measuring instrument can be a set of digital scales with an accuracy greater than 0.1 g, though in the past it was a steelyard balance with the measuring cylinder hooking directly onto the scales.

== Calculation ==
- Bulk Density (kg/hL)= Mass of Grain Captured (in kg) /Volume of measuring container (in L) x 100

The measuring container will usually be 1L or 0.5L to make the calculations easy.
