= Grist =

Grain separated from chaff for grinding

Grist is grain that has been separated from its chaff in preparation for grinding. It can also refer to grain that has been coarsely ground at a gristmill. The term derives from the Old English verb grindan, meaning "to grind."

Grist can be ground into meal or flour, depending on the fineness of the grind. Maize prepared as grist is called grits when coarsely ground, and cornmeal when ground more finely. Other grains such as wheat, oats, barley, and buckwheat are similarly ground and sifted into flour or farina.

In addition to its use as a food product, grist is a key ingredient in brewing and distillation, where it is mashed to extract fermentable sugars.

== Phrase "grist to the mill" ==
The proverb "all is grist to the mill" means that everything can be made useful or turned to advantage. Variations include "all's grist that comes to his mill," implying that a person can profit from any opportunity that arises.

Historically, a miller would grind any grain brought to his mill and take a portion of the resulting flour as payment. Consequently, all grain delivered to the mill represented potential income regardless of quality. The phrase's earliest recorded usage dates to the 16th century, though the saying itself is likely older.

The term gristmill was commonly used in both the United States and United Kingdom to describe small mills open to public use.

== Surname "Grist" ==
The surname Grist is of English origin, derived from the occupational trade of grinding grain at a mill. It has historical roots in rural regions such as Wiltshire, Hampshire, and Middlesex, where milling played a significant role in local economies. Families bearing this name were often involved in milling or related agricultural occupations.

Genealogical research has traced the history of the Grist family back several centuries, with evidence linking branches of the family to the milling trade and rural communities in England. DNA studies and family history projects continue to explore the lineage and geographic distribution of the Grist name.
