= Whole grain =

Cereal containing endosperm, germ and bran

A whole grain is a grain of any cereal or pseudocereal that contains the endosperm, germ, and bran, in contrast to refined grains, which retain only the endosperm.

As part of a general healthy diet, consumption of whole grains is associated with lower risk of several diseases. Whole grains are a source of carbohydrates, multiple nutrients and dietary fiber.

== Varieties ==
Whole grain sources include:

Cereals

- Wheat (spelt, emmer, farro, einkorn, Kamut, durum)
- Rice (Black rice, brown, red, and other colored rice varieties)
- Barley (hulled and dehulled but not pearl)
- Maize or corn
- Rye
- Oats (including hull-less or naked oats)
Processing rice: from seed to whole grain to refined grain

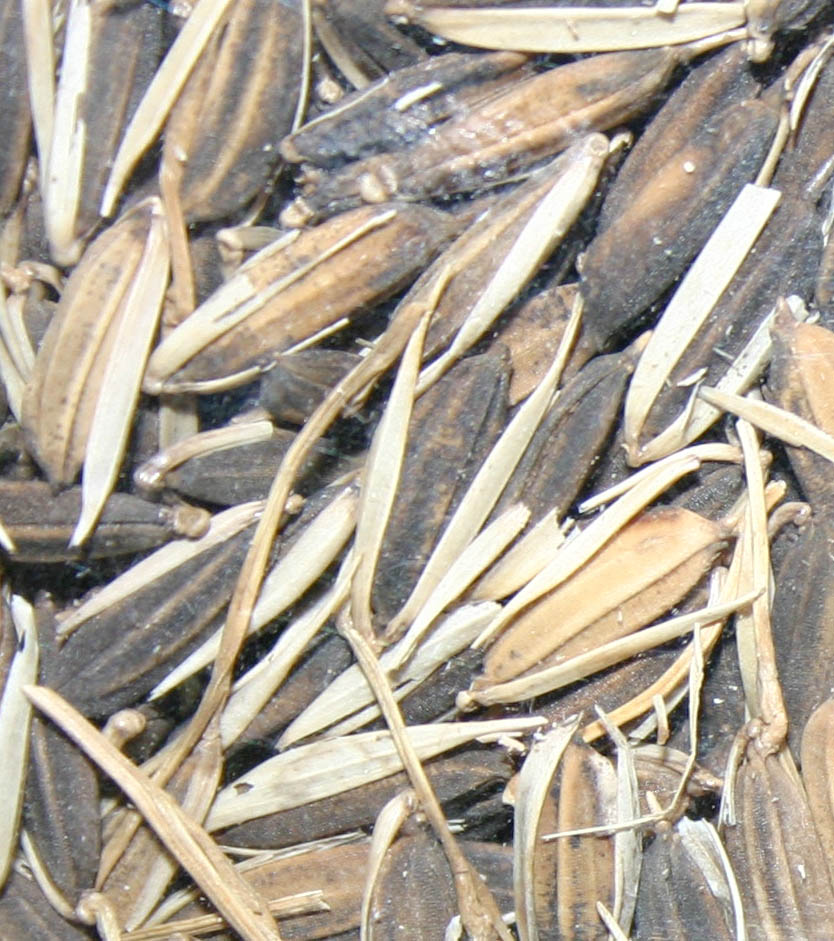
African rice in its inedible husk (seed rice, can sprout)

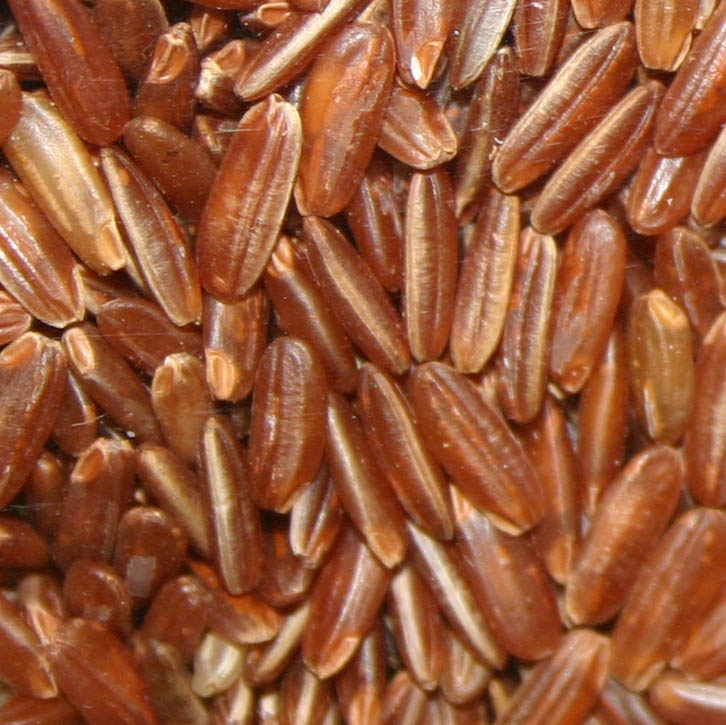
The same rice, dehusked (whole grain rice, colour varies by variety)

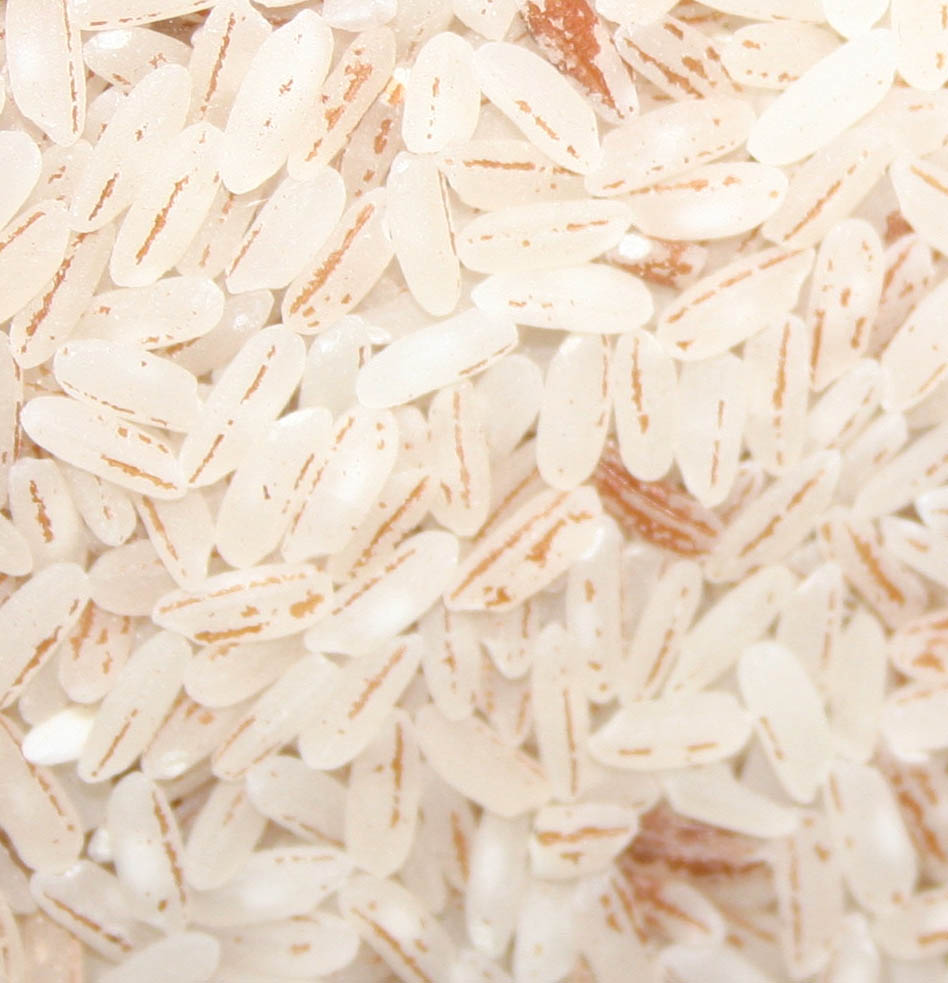
The same rice, with almost all bran and germ removed to make white rice

Minor cereals

- Millets
- Sorghum
- Teff
- Triticale
- Canary grass
- Job's tears
- Fonio, black fonio, Asian millet
- Wild rice

Pseudocereals

- Amaranth
- Buckwheat, Tartary buckwheat
- Quinoa

== Health effects ==
Because whole grain foods are more healthful than the equivalent with refined flours, organizations such as the Danish Whole Grain Partnership promote the consumption of whole grain foods as a public health measure.

=== Nutrition ===
Whole grains are a source of multiple nutrients and dietary fiber, recommended for children and adults in several daily servings containing a variety of foods that meet whole grain-rich criteria. As components of breakfast cereals, whole grains are associated with improved micronutrient intake and lower risk of several diseases. Their effects on gastrointestinal health, risk of obesity and cognition need further evaluation.

Cereal proteins have low quality, due to deficiencies in essential amino acids, mainly lysine. Supplementation of cereals with proteins from other food sources (mainly legumes) is commonly used to compensate for this deficiency, since the limitation of a single essential amino acid causes the others to break down and become excreted, which is especially important during the period of growth. In contrast, the proteins of the pseudocereals have a high nutritional value, close to those of casein (the main protein in milk). Quinoa and amaranth are the most nutritious grains due to their high content and quality of proteins, with high levels of lysine and other essential amino acids.

=== Disease risk ===
Manufacturers of foods containing whole grains in specified amounts are allowed a health claim for marketing purposes in the United States, stating: "low fat diets rich in fiber-containing grain products, fruits, and vegetables may reduce the risk of some types of cancer, a disease associated with many factors" and "diets low in saturated fat and cholesterol and rich in fruits, vegetables, and grain products that contain some types of dietary fiber, particularly soluble fiber, may reduce the risk of heart disease, a disease associated with many factors". The scientific opinion of the European Food Safety Authority related to health claims on gut health or bowel function, weight control, blood glucose and insulin levels, weight management, blood cholesterol, satiety, glycemic index, digestive function and cardiovascular health is "that the food constituent, whole grain, (...) is not sufficiently characterised in relation to the claimed health effects" and "that a cause and effect relationship cannot be established between the consumption of whole grain and the claimed effects considered in this opinion."

By supplying high dietary fiber content, as part of a general healthy diet, consumption of whole grains may lower risk of several diseases, including coronary heart disease, stroke and cancer, with lower all-cause mortality. Regular whole-grain consumption may lower elevated LDL and triglyceride levels, which are risk factors for cardiovascular diseases. Whole grain consumption is associated with a lower risk of type 2 diabetes.

In 2012, Health Canada stated that "the evidence to date from clinical trials and prospective cohort studies was not sufficient to support a whole grains and coronary heart disease risk reduction claim in Canada". A 2017 review of clinical trials found insufficient evidence for a relationship between whole grain consumption and lowered risk of cardiovascular diseases.

In 2018, the National Heart Foundation of New Zealand that reviewed epidemiological evidence published a position statement, "the evidence shows that higher whole grain and bran intakes were consistently associated with a 16-30% lower risk of heart disease. On average, three servings of whole grains per day provides heart health benefits".

A 2026 review of clinical trials found that consuming four to six servings of whole grains each day reduces several cardiometabolic risk factors. A 2025 updated systematic analysis of the Global Burden of Disease study in the World Health Organization European Region from 1990 to 2019 found that most diet-related cardiovascular disease deaths were caused by a diet low in whole grains.

The American Institute for Cancer Research and World Cancer Research Fund International have stated that there is strong evidence that whole grains decrease risk of colorectal cancer.

=== Gluten concerns ===
In genetically susceptible people, gluten (proteins found in wheat, barley, rye, oat, and related species and hybrids) can trigger coeliac disease. Coeliac disease affects about 1% of the general population in developed countries. There is evidence that most cases remain undiagnosed and untreated. The only known effective treatment is a strict lifelong gluten-free diet. Minor cereals and pseudocereals may be a reasonable alternative to replace gluten-containing cereals for people who need to follow a gluten-free diet.

While coeliac disease is caused by a reaction to wheat proteins, it is not the same as a wheat allergy. Other diseases triggered by eating gluten are non-coeliac gluten sensitivity, (estimated to affect 0.5% to 13% of the general population), gluten ataxia and dermatitis herpetiformis.

== Regulations ==
In the United States wholegrain products can be identified by the ingredients list. "Wheat flour" (as opposed to "wholegrain wheat flour" or "whole-wheat flour") as the first ingredient is not a clear indicator of the product's wholegrain content. If two ingredients are listed as grain products but only the second is listed as wholegrain, the entire product may contain between 1% and 49% wholegrain. Many breads are colored brown (often with molasses or caramel color) and made to look like wholegrain when they are not. In addition, some food manufacturers make foods with wholegrain ingredients, but, because wholegrain ingredients are not the dominant ingredient, they are not wholegrain products. Contrary to popular belief, wholegrains are not indicative of fiber. The amount of fiber varies from grain to grain, and some products may have things like bran, peas, or other foods added to boost the fiber content.

According to the American Association of Cereal Chemists definition, "Whole grains shall consist of the intact, ground, cracked or flaked caryopsis, whose principal anatomical components - the starchy endosperm, germ and bran - are present in the same relative proportions as they exist in the intact caryopsis."

=== US standards of identity ===
The following names indicate whole-grain products, in accordance with the US federal government:

- "Whole wheat bread"
- "Whole millet"
- "Whole wheat buns"
- "Whole wheat macaroni"
- "Whole wheat spaghetti"
- "Whole wheat vermicelli"
- "Cracked wheat" (as an ingredient, not as part of a product name like "cracked wheat bread")
- "Crushed wheat"
- "Whole wheat flour"
- "Graham flour" (as an ingredient, not as part of a product name like "graham crackers")
- "Entire wheat flour"
- "Bromated whole wheat flour"
- "Whole durum flour"
- "Bulgur (cracked wheat)" ("bulgur" by itself may or may not indicate whole grain, and "cracked wheat" is not synonymous with bulgur)

=== Canadian standards of identity ===
There are multiple grains such as cereal grains (e.g. wheat, rice, oats, barley, corn, wild rice, and rye) as well as pseudocereals (e.g. quinoa and buckwheat) that may be labeled whole grains.

When wheat is milled to make flour, the parts of the grain are usually separated and then are recombined to make specific types of flour, such as whole wheat, whole grain, white cake and pastry flour, and all-purpose white flour. If all parts of the kernel are used in the same relative proportions as they exist in the original kernel, then the flour is considered whole grain.

Under the Food and Drug Regulations, up to 5% of the kernel can be removed to help reduce rancidity and prolong the shelf life of whole-wheat flour. The portion of the kernel that is removed for this purpose contains much of the germ and some of the bran. If this portion of the kernel has been removed, the flour would no longer be considered whole grain.

=== UK regulations ===
In the UK the legally protected term is wholemeal rather than wholegrain. There are voluntary guidelines on what can be labelled a wholegrain product.

== See also ==
- Ancient grains
- Alkylresorcinols
- Unifine mill
- Wheatberry
- Whole foods
- Whole grain stamp
