= Dietary fiber =

Portion of plant-derived food that cannot be completely digested

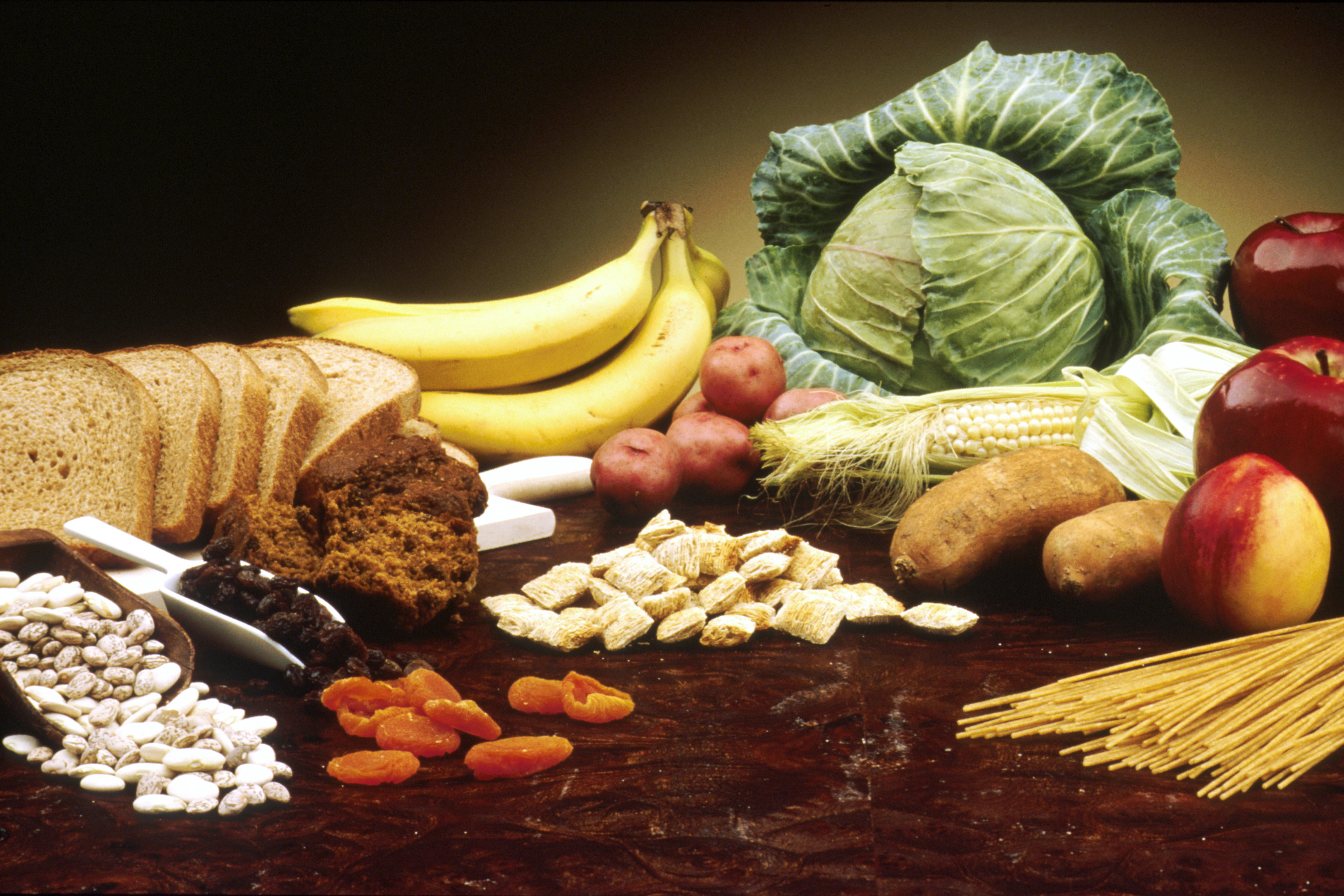
Foods rich in fibers: fruits, vegetables and grains

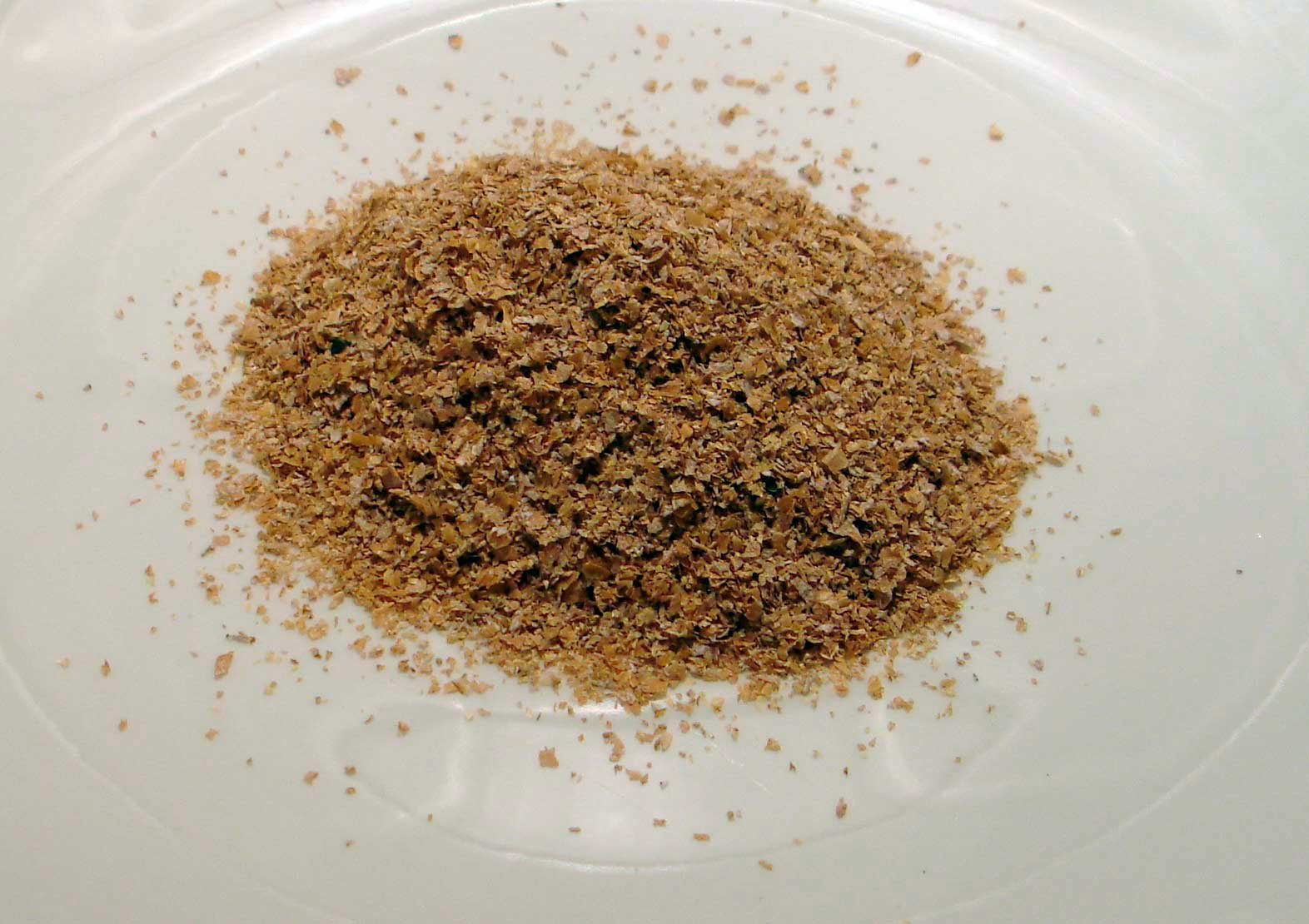
Wheat bran is rich in dietary fiber.

Dietary fiber (also spelled fibre), or roughage, is the portion of plant-derived food that cannot be completely broken down by human digestive enzymes. Dietary fibers are diverse in chemical composition and can be grouped generally by their solubility, viscosity and fermentability, which affect how fibers are processed in the body. Dietary fiber has two main subtypes: soluble and insoluble. They are components of many foods from plants, such as legumes, whole grains, cereals, vegetables, fruits, nuts, and seeds. Regularly consuming substantial dietary fiber is generally associated with supporting health and lowering the risks of several diseases. Dietary fiber consists of non-starch polysaccharides and other plant components, such as cellulose, resistant starch, resistant dextrins, inulins, lignins, chitins, pectins, beta-glucans, and oligosaccharides.

Food sources of dietary fiber have traditionally been divided according to proportion of soluble vs. insoluble fiber. The two types are defined according to their characteristics of viscosity and fermentability, with different advantages between the types. Plant foods contain both types in varying amounts. Bulking fibers, such as cellulose and hemicellulose (including psyllium), absorb and hold water, promoting bowel movement regularity. Viscous fibers, such as beta-glucan and psyllium, thicken the fecal mass. Fermentable fibers, such as resistant starch, xanthan gum, and inulin, feed the bacteria and microbiota of the large intestine and are metabolized to yield short-chain fatty acids, which have diverse roles in gastrointestinal health.

Soluble fiber (fermentable fiber, or prebiotic fiber) – which dissolves in water – is generally fermented in the colon into gases and physiologically active by-products, such as short-chain fatty acids, produced in the colon by gut bacteria. Examples are beta glucans (in oats, barley, and mushrooms) and raw guar gum. Psyllium – soluble, viscous, and non-fermented fiber – is a bulking fiber, retaining water as it moves through the digestive system, easing defecation. Soluble fiber is generally viscous and delays gastric emptying, which in humans can result in an extended feeling of fullness. Inulin (in chicory root), wheat dextrin, oligosaccharides, and resistant starches (in legumes and bananas) are soluble, non-viscous fibers. Regular intake of soluble fibers, such as beta-glucans, from oats or barley, have been shown to lower blood levels of LDL cholesterol. Soluble fiber supplements also significantly lower LDL cholesterol.

Insoluble fiber does not dissolve in water and is inert, unaffected by digestive enzymes in the upper gastrointestinal tract. Examples include wheat bran, cellulose, and lignin. Coarsely ground insoluble fiber triggers the secretion of mucus in the large intestine, providing bulking. However, finely ground insoluble fiber does not have this effect and can instead cause constipation. Some forms of insoluble fiber, such as resistant starches, can be fermented in the colon.

== Definition ==
Dietary fiber is defined to be plant components that are not broken down by human digestive enzymes. In the late 20th century, only lignin and some polysaccharides were known to satisfy this definition, but in the early 21st century, resistant starch and oligosaccharides were included as dietary fiber components. The most accepted definition of dietary fiber is "all polysaccharides and lignin, which are not digested by the endogenous secretion of the human digestive tract". Currently, most animal nutritionists are using either a physiological definition, "the dietary components resistant to degradation by mammalian enzymes", or a chemical definition, "the sum of non-starch polysaccharides (NSP) and lignin".

== Types and sources ==
Water-insoluble dietary fibers
Nutrient	E number	Source, comments
β-glucans (a few of which are water-soluble)
Cellulose	E 460	Cereals, fruit, vegetables (in all plants in general)
Chitin	—N/a	In fungi, exoskeleton of insects and crustaceans
Hemicellulose		Cereals, bran, timber, legumes
Hexoses	—N/a	Wheat, barley
Pentose	—N/a	Rye, oat
Lignin	—N/a	Stones of fruits, vegetables (filaments of the garden bean), cereals
Xanthan gum	E 415	Production with Xanthomonas bacteria from sugar substrates
Resistant starch		Can be starch protected by seed or shell (type RS1), granular starch (type RS2) or retrograded starch (type RS3)
Resistant starch	—N/a	High-amylose corn, barley, high-amylose wheat, legumes, raw bananas, cooked and cooled pasta and potatoes

Water-soluble dietary fibers
Nutrient	E number	Source/Comments
Arabinoxylan (a hemicellulose)	—N/a	Psyllium
Fructans		Replace or complement in some plant taxa the starch as storage carbohydrate
Inulin	—N/a	In diverse plants, e.g. topinambour, chicory, etc.
Polyuronide
Pectin	E 440	In fruit skins (mainly of apples, quinces), vegetables
Alginic acids (Alginates)	E 400 – E 407	In algae
Sodium alginate	E 401	
Potassium alginate	E 402	
Ammonium alginate	E 403	
Calcium alginate	E 404	
Propylene glycol alginate (PGA)	E 405	
agar	E 406	
carrageenan	E 407	Red algae
Raffinose	—N/a	Legumes
Polydextrose	E 1200	Synthetic polymer, c. 1 kcal/g

=== Contents in food ===
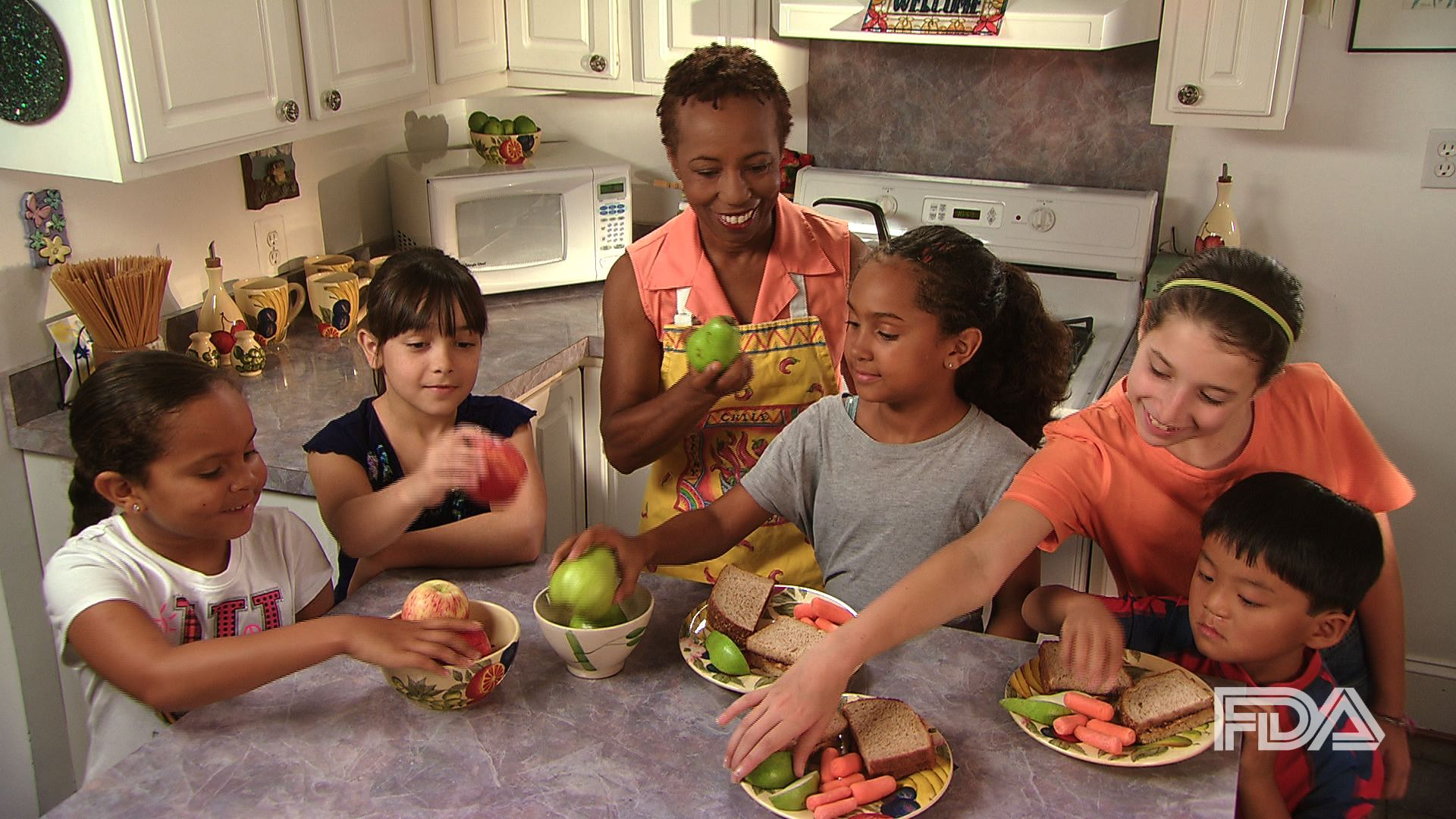
Children eating fiber-rich food

Dietary fiber is found in fruits, vegetables and whole grains. The amounts of fiber contained in common foods are listed in the following table:

Fiber content of some common food
Food group	Serving mean	Fiber mass per serving
Fruit	120 mL (1/2 cup)	1.1 g
Dark green vegetables	120 mL (1/2 cup)	6.4 g
Orange vegetables	120 mL (1/2 cup)	2.1 g
Cooked dry beans (legumes)	120 mL (1/2 cup)	8.0 g
Starchy vegetables	120 mL (1/2 cup)	1.7 g
Other vegetables	120 mL (1/2 cup)	1.1 g
Whole grains	28 g (1.0 oz)	2.4 g
Meat	28 g (1.0 oz)	0.1 g

Dietary fiber is found in plants, typically eaten whole, raw or cooked, although fiber can be added to make dietary supplements and fiber-rich processed foods. Grain bran products have the highest fiber contents, such as crude corn bran (79 g per 100 g) and crude wheat bran (43 g per 100 g), which are ingredients for manufactured foods. Medical authorities, such as the Mayo Clinic, recommend adding fiber-rich products to the Standard American Diet because fiber intake is lower on such a diet that is rich in processed and artificially sweetened foods with minimal intake of vegetables and legumes.

=== Plant sources ===
Some plants contain significant amounts of soluble and insoluble fiber. For example, plums and prunes have a thick skin covering a juicy pulp. The skin is a source of insoluble fiber, whereas soluble fiber is in the pulp. Grapes also contain a fair amount of fiber.

==== Soluble fiber ====
Found in varying quantities in all plant foods, including:

- Legumes (peas, soybeans, lupins and other beans)
- Oats, rye, chia, and barley
- Some fruits (including figs, avocados, plums, prunes, berries, bananas, apples, oranges, quinces and pears)
- Certain vegetables such as broccoli, carrots, and Jerusalem artichokes
- Root tubers and root vegetables such as sweet potatoes and onions (skins of these are sources of insoluble fiber also)
- Psyllium seed husks (a mucilage soluble fiber) and flax seeds
- nuts, with almonds being the highest in dietary fiber

==== Insoluble fiber ====
Sources include:

- Whole grain foods
- Wheat and corn bran
- Legumes such as beans and peas
- Nuts and seeds
- Potato skins
- Lignans
- Vegetables such as green beans, cauliflower, zucchini (courgette), celery, and nopal
- Some fruits including avocado, and unripe bananas
- The skins of some fruits, including kiwifruit, grapes and tomatoes

=== Supplements ===
These are a few example forms of fiber that have been sold as supplements or food additives. These may be marketed to consumers for nutritional purposes, treatment of various gastrointestinal disorders, and for such possible health benefits as lowering cholesterol levels, reducing the risk of colon cancer, and losing weight.

==== Soluble fiber ====
Soluble fiber supplements may be beneficial for alleviating symptoms of irritable bowel syndrome, such as diarrhea or constipation and abdominal discomfort. Prebiotic soluble fiber products, like those containing inulin or oligosaccharides, may contribute to relief from inflammatory bowel disease, as in Crohn's disease, ulcerative colitis, and Clostridioides difficile, due in part to the short-chain fatty acids produced with subsequent anti-inflammatory actions upon the bowel. Fiber supplements may be effective in an overall dietary plan for managing irritable bowel syndrome by modification of food choices.

==== Insoluble fiber ====
One insoluble fiber, resistant starch from high-amylose corn, has been used as a supplement and may contribute to improving insulin sensitivity and glycemic management as well as promoting regularity and possibly relief of diarrhea. One preliminary finding indicates that resistant corn starch may reduce symptoms of ulcerative colitis.

==== Inulins ====
Chemically defined as oligosaccharides and occurring naturally in most plants, inulins have nutritional value as carbohydrates, or more specifically as fructans, a polymer of the natural plant sugar, fructose. Inulin is typically extracted by manufacturers from enriched plant sources such as chicory roots or Jerusalem artichokes for use in prepared foods. Subtly sweet, it can be used to replace sugar, fat, and flour, is often used to improve the flow and mixing qualities of powdered nutritional supplements, and has potential health value as a prebiotic fermentable fiber.

As a prebiotic fermentable fiber, inulin is metabolized by gut flora to yield short-chain fatty acids (see below), which increase absorption of calcium, magnesium, and iron.

The primary disadvantage of inulin is its fermentation within the intestinal tract, possibly causing flatulence and digestive distress at doses higher than 15 g/day in most people. Individuals with digestive diseases have benefited from removing fructose and inulin from their diet. While clinical studies have shown changes in the microbiota at lower levels of inulin intake, higher intake amounts may be needed to achieve effects on body weight.

==== Vegetable gums ====
Vegetable gum fiber supplements are relatively new to the market. Often sold as a powder, vegetable gum fibers dissolve easily with no aftertaste. In preliminary clinical trials, they have proven effective for the treatment of irritable bowel syndrome. Examples of vegetable gum fibers are guar gum and gum arabic.

== Activity in the gut ==
Many molecules that are considered to be "dietary fiber" are so because humans lack the necessary enzymes to split the glycosidic bond and they reach the large intestine. Many foods contain varying types of dietary fibers, all of which contribute to health in different ways.

Dietary fibers make three primary contributions: bulking, viscosity and fermentation. Different fibers have different effects, suggesting that a variety of dietary fibers contribute to overall health. Some fibers contribute through one primary mechanism. For instance, cellulose and wheat bran provide excellent bulking effects, but are minimally fermented. Alternatively, many dietary fibers can contribute to health through more than one of these mechanisms. For instance, psyllium provides bulking as well as viscosity.

Bulking fibers can be soluble (e.g. psyllium) or insoluble (e.g. cellulose and hemicellulose). They absorb water and can significantly increase stool weight and regularity. Most bulking fibers are not fermented or are minimally fermented throughout the intestinal tract.

Viscous fibers thicken the contents of the intestinal tract and may attenuate the absorption of sugar, reduce sugar response after eating, and reduce lipid absorption (notably shown with cholesterol absorption). Their use in food formulations is often limited to low levels, due to their viscosity and thickening effects. Some viscous fibers may also be partially or fully fermented within the intestinal tract (guar gum, beta-glucan, glucomannan and pectins), but some viscous fibers are minimally or not fermented (modified cellulose such as methylcellulose and psyllium).

Fermentable fibers are consumed by the microbiota within the large intestines, mildly increasing fecal bulk and producing short-chain fatty acids as byproducts with wide-ranging physiological activities. Resistant starch, inulin, fructooligosaccharide and galactooligosaccharide are dietary fibers which are fully fermented. These include insoluble as well as soluble fibers. This fermentation influences the expression of many genes within the large intestine, which affect digestive function and lipid and glucose metabolism, as well as the immune system, inflammation and more.

Fiber fermentation produces gas (majorly carbon dioxide, hydrogen, and methane) and short-chain fatty acids. Isolated or purified fermentable fibers are more rapidly fermented in the fore-gut and may result in undesirable gastrointestinal symptoms (bloating, indigestion and flatulence).

Dietary fibers can change the nature of the contents of the gastrointestinal tract and can change how other nutrients and chemicals are absorbed through bulking and viscosity. Some types of soluble fibers bind to bile acids in the small intestine, making them less likely to re-enter the body; this in turn lowers cholesterol levels in the blood from the actions of cytochrome P450-mediated oxidation of cholesterol.

Insoluble fiber is associated with reduced risk of diabetes, but the mechanism by which this is achieved is unknown. One type of insoluble dietary fiber, resistant starch, may increase insulin sensitivity in healthy people, in type 2 diabetics, and in individuals with insulin resistance, possibly contributing to reduced risk of type 2 diabetes.

Not yet formally proposed as an essential macronutrient, dietary fiber has importance in the diet, with regulatory authorities in many developed countries recommending increases in fiber intake.

=== Physicochemical properties ===
Dietary fiber has distinct physicochemical properties. Most semi-solid foods, fiber and fat are a combination of gel matrices which are hydrated or collapsed with microstructural elements, globules, solutions or encapsulating walls. Fresh fruit and vegetables are cellular materials.

- The cells of cooked potatoes and legumes are gels filled with gelatinized starch granules. The cellular structures of fruits and vegetables are foams with a closed cell geometry filled with a gel, surrounded by cell walls which are composites with an amorphous matrix strengthened by complex carbohydrate fibers.
- Particle size and interfacial interactions with adjacent matrices affect the mechanical properties of food composites.
- Food polymers may be soluble in and/or plasticized by water.
- The variables include chemical structure, polymer concentration, molecular weight, degree of chain branching, the extent of ionization (for electrolytes), solution pH, ionic strength and temperature.
- Cross-linking of different polymers, protein and polysaccharides, either through chemical covalent bonds or cross-links through molecular entanglement or hydrogen or ionic bond cross-linking.
- Cooking and chewing food alters these physicochemical properties and hence absorption and movement through the stomach and along the intestine

=== Upper gastrointestinal tract ===
Following a meal, the stomach and upper gastrointestinal contents consist of:

- Food compounds
- Complex lipids/micellar/aqueous/hydrocolloid and hydrophobic phases
- Hydrophilic phases
- Solid, liquid, colloidal and gas bubble phases.

Micelles are colloid-sized clusters of molecules which form in conditions as those above, similar to the critical micelle concentration of detergents.In the upper gastrointestinal tract, these compounds consist of bile acids and di- and monoacyl glycerols which solubilize triacylglycerols and cholesterol.

Two mechanisms bring nutrients into contact with the epithelium:

1. intestinal contractions create turbulence; and
2. convection currents direct contents from the lumen to the epithelial surface.

The multiple physical phases in the intestinal tract slow the rate of absorption compared to that of the suspension solvent alone.

1. Nutrients diffuse through the thin, relatively unstirred layer of fluid adjacent to the epithelium.
2. Immobilizing of nutrients and other chemicals within complex polysaccharide molecules affects their release and subsequent absorption from the small intestine, an effect influential on the glycemic index.
3. Molecules begin to interact as their concentration increases. During absorption, water must be absorbed at a rate commensurate with the absorption of solutes. The transport of actively and passively absorbed nutrients across epithelium is affected by the unstirred water layer covering the microvillus membrane.
4. The presence of mucus or fiber, e.g., pectin or guar, in the unstirred layer may alter the viscosity and solute diffusion coefficient.

Adding viscous polysaccharides to carbohydrate meals can reduce post-prandial blood glucose concentrations. Wheat and maize but not oats modify glucose absorption, the rate being dependent upon the particle size. The reduction in absorption rate with guar gum may be due to the increased resistance by viscous solutions to the convective flows created by intestinal contractions.

Dietary fiber interacts with pancreatic and enteric enzymes and their substrates. Human pancreatic enzyme activity is reduced when incubated with most fiber sources. Fiber may affect amylase activity and hence the rate of hydrolysis of starch. The more viscous polysaccharides extend the mouth-to-cecum transit time; guar, tragacanth and pectin being slower than wheat bran.

=== Colon ===
The colon may be regarded as two organs,

1. The right side (cecum and ascending colon), a fermenter. The right side of the colon is involved in nutrient salvage so that dietary fiber, resistant starch, fat and protein are utilized by bacteria and the end-products absorbed for use by the body
2. The left side (transverse, descending, and sigmoid colon), affecting continence.

The presence of bacteria in the colon produces an 'organ' of intense, mainly reductive, metabolic activity, whereas the liver is oxidative. The substrates utilized by the cecum have either passed along the entire intestine or are biliary excretion products. The effects of dietary fiber in the colon are on

1. Bacterial fermentation of some dietary fibers
2. Thereby an increase in bacterial mass
3. An increase in bacterial enzyme activity
4. Changes in the water-holding capacity of the fiber residue after fermentation

Enlargement of the cecum is a common finding when some dietary fibers are fed and this is now believed to be normal physiological adjustment. Such an increase may be due to a number of factors, prolonged cecal residence of the fiber, increased bacterial mass, or increased bacterial end-products. Some non-absorbed carbohydrates, e.g. pectin, gum arabic, oligosaccharides and resistant starch, are fermented to short-chain fatty acids (chiefly acetic, propionic and n-butyric), and carbon dioxide, hydrogen and methane. Almost all of these short-chain fatty acids will be absorbed from the colon. This means that fecal short-chain fatty acid estimations do not reflect cecal and colonic fermentation, only the efficiency of absorption, the ability of the fiber residue to sequestrate short-chain fatty acids, and the continued fermentation of fiber around the colon, which presumably will continue until the substrate is exhausted. The production of short-chain fatty acids has several possible actions on the gut mucosa. All of the short-chain fatty acids are readily absorbed by the colonic mucosa, but only acetic acid reaches the systemic circulation in appreciable amounts. Butyric acid appears to be used as a fuel by the colonic mucosa as the preferred energy source for colonic cells.

=== Cholesterol metabolism ===
Dietary fiber may act on each phase of ingestion, digestion, absorption and excretion to affect cholesterol metabolism, such as the following:

1. Caloric energy of foods through a bulking effect
2. Slowing of gastric emptying time
3. A glycemic index type of action on absorption
4. A slowing of bile acid absorption in the ileum so bile acids escape through to the cecum
5. Altered or increased bile acid metabolism in the cecum
6. Indirectly by absorbed short-chain fatty acids, especially propionic acid, resulting from fiber fermentation affecting the cholesterol metabolism in the liver.
7. Binding of bile acids to fiber or bacteria in the cecum with increased fecal loss from the entero-hepatic circulation.

One action of some fibers is to reduce the reabsorption of bile acids in the ileum and hence the amount and type of bile acid and fats reaching the colon. A reduction in the reabsorption of bile acid from the ileum has several direct effects.

1. Bile acids may be trapped within the lumen of the ileum either because of a high luminal viscosity or because of binding to a dietary fiber.
2. Lignin in fiber absorbs bile acids, but the unconjugated form of the bile acids are absorbed more than the conjugated form. In the ileum where bile acids are primarily absorbed the bile acids are predominantly conjugated.
3. The enterohepatic circulation of bile acids may be altered and there is an increased flow of bile acids to the cecum, where they are deconjugated and 7alpha-dehydroxylated.
4. These water-soluble form, bile acids e.g., deoxycholic and lithocholic are absorbed to dietary fiber and an increased fecal loss of sterols, dependent in part on the amount and type of fiber.
5. A further factor is an increase in the bacterial mass and activity of the ileum as some fibers e.g., pectin are digested by bacteria. The bacterial mass increases and cecal bacterial activity increases.
6. The enteric loss of bile acids results in increased synthesis of bile acids from cholesterol which in turn reduces body cholesterol.

The fibers that are most effective in influencing sterol metabolism (e.g. pectin) are fermented in the colon. It is therefore unlikely that the reduction in body cholesterol is due to adsorption to this fermented fiber in the colon.

1. There might be alterations in the end-products of bile acid bacterial metabolism or the release of short chain fatty acids which are absorbed from the colon, return to the liver in the portal vein and modulate either the synthesis of cholesterol or its catabolism to bile acids.
2. The prime mechanism whereby fiber influences cholesterol metabolism is through bacteria binding bile acids in the colon after the initial deconjugation and dehydroxylation. The sequestered bile acids are then excreted in feces.
3. Fermentable fibers e.g., pectin will increase the bacterial mass in the colon by virtue of their providing a medium for bacterial growth.
4. Other fibers, e.g., gum arabic, act as stabilizers and cause a significant decrease in serum cholesterol without increasing fecal bile acid excretion.

=== Fecal weight ===
Feces consist of a plasticine-like material, made up of water, bacteria, lipids, sterols, mucus and fiber.

1. Feces are 75% water; bacteria make a large contribution to the dry weight, the residue being unfermented fiber and excreted compounds.
2. Fecal output may vary over a range of between 20 and 280 g over 24 hours. The amount of feces egested a day varies for any one individual over a period of time.
3. Of dietary constituents, only dietary fiber increases fecal weight.

Water is distributed in the colon in three ways:

1. Free water which can be absorbed from the colon.
2. Water that is incorporated into bacterial mass.
3. Water that is bound by fiber.

Fecal weight is dictated by:

1. the holding of water by the residual dietary fiber after fermentation.
2. the bacterial mass.
3. There may also be an added osmotic effect of products of bacterial fermentation on fecal mass.

== Effects of fiber intake ==
Preliminary research indicates that fiber may affect health by different mechanisms.

Effects of fiber include:

- Increases food volume without increasing caloric content to the same extent as digestible carbohydrates, providing satiety which may reduce appetite (both insoluble and soluble fiber)
- Attracts water and forms a viscous gel during digestion, slowing the emptying of the stomach, shortening intestinal transit time, shielding carbohydrates from enzymes, and delaying absorption of glucose, which lowers variance in blood sugar levels (soluble fiber)
- Lowers total and LDL cholesterol, which may reduce the risk of cardiovascular disease (soluble fiber)
- Reduces blood pressure, being negatively associated with all-cause and cardiovascular mortality, and may prevent the development of cardiovascular disease in offspring
- Regulates blood sugar, which may reduce glucose and insulin levels in diabetic patients and may lower risk of diabetes (insoluble fiber)
- Speeds the passage of foods through the digestive system, which facilitates regular defecation (insoluble fiber)
- Adds bulk to the stool, which relieves constipation (insoluble fiber)
- Balances intestinal pH and stimulates intestinal fermentation production of short-chain fatty acids.

Fiber does not bind to minerals and vitamins and therefore does not restrict their absorption, but rather evidence exists that fermentable fiber sources improve absorption of minerals, especially calcium.

=== Research ===
As of 2019, preliminary clinical research on the potential health effects of a regular high-fiber diet included studies on the risk of several cancers, cardiovascular diseases, and type 2 diabetes.

High-fiber intake is associated with a decreased risk of breast cancer, colon cancer and lower mortality.

== Dietary recommendations ==
=== Australia ===
The Australian government recommends consumption of an "Adequate Intake" of dietary fiber to reduce the risk of several chronic diseases.

Age	Adequate Intake per day
1-3 years old	14g
4-8 years old	18g
9-13 years old, male	24g
9-13 years old, female	20g
14-18 years old, male	28g
14-18 years old, female	22g
19+ years old, male	30g
19+ years old, female	25g

=== European Union ===
According to the European Food Safety Authority (EFSA) Panel on Nutrition, Novel Foods and Food Allergens, which deals with the establishment of Dietary Reference Values for carbohydrates and dietary fibre, "based on the available evidence on bowel function, the Panel considers dietary fibre intakes of 25 g per day to be adequate for normal laxation in adults".

=== United States ===
Current recommendations from the United States National Academy of Medicine (NAM) (formerly Institute of Medicine) of the National Academy of Sciences state that for Adequate Intake, adult men ages 19–50 consume 38 grams of dietary fiber per day, men 51 and older 30 grams, women ages 19–50 to consume 25 grams per day, women 51 and older 21 grams. These are based on three studies observing that people in the highest quintile of fiber intake consumed a median of 14 grams of fiber per 1,000 Calories and had the lowest risk of coronary heart disease, especially for those who ate more cereal fiber.

The U.S. Academy of Nutrition and Dietetics (AND) reiterates the recommendations of the NAM. A 1995 research team's recommendation for children is that intake should equal age in years plus 5 g/day (e.g., a four-year-old should consume 9 g/day). The NAM's current recommendation for children is 19 g/day for age 1–3 years and 25 g/day for age 4–8 years. No guidelines have yet been established for the elderly or very ill. Patients with current constipation, vomiting, and abdominal pain should see a physician. Certain bulking agents are not commonly recommended with the prescription of opioids because the slow transit time mixed with larger stools may lead to severe constipation, pain, or obstruction.

On average, North Americans consume less than 50% of the dietary fiber levels recommended for good health. In the preferred food choices of today's youth, this value may be as low as 20%, a factor considered by experts as contributing to the obesity levels seen in many developed countries. Recognizing the growing scientific evidence for physiological benefits of increased fiber intake, regulatory agencies such as the U.S. Food and Drug Administration (FDA) have given approvals to food products making health claims for fiber. The FDA classifies which ingredients qualify as being "fiber", and requires for product labeling that a physiological benefit is gained by adding the fiber ingredient. As of 2008, the FDA approved health claims for qualified fiber products to display labeling that regular consumption may reduce blood cholesterol levels – which can lower the risk of coronary heart disease – and also reduce the risk of some types of cancer.

Viscous fiber sources gaining FDA approval are:

- Psyllium seed husk (7 g/day)
- Beta-glucan from oat bran, whole oats, or rolled oats; or whole grain or dry-milled barley (3 g/day)

Other examples of bulking fiber sources used in functional foods and supplements include cellulose, guar gum and xanthan gum. Other examples of fermentable fiber sources (from plant foods or biotechnology) used in functional foods and supplements include resistant starch, inulin, fructans, fructooligo saccharides, oligo- or polysaccharides, and resistant dextrins, which may be partially or fully fermented.

Consistent intake of fermentable fiber may reduce the risk of chronic diseases. Insufficient fiber in the diet can lead to constipation.

=== United Kingdom ===
In 2018, the British Nutrition Foundation issued a statement to define dietary fiber more concisely and list the potential health benefits established to date, while increasing its recommended daily minimum intake to 30 grams for healthy adults.

The use of certain analytical methods to quantify dietary fiber by nature of its indigestion ability results in many other indigestible components being isolated along with the carbohydrate components of dietary fiber. These components include resistant starches and oligosaccharides along with other substances that exist within the plant cell structure and contribute to the material that passes through the digestive tract. Such components are likely to have physiological effects.

Diets naturally high in fiber can be considered to bring about several main physiological consequences:

- increases fecal bulk and helps prevent constipation by decreasing fecal transit time in the large intestine
- improves gastro-intestinal health
- improves glucose tolerance and the insulin response following a meal
- increases colonic fermentation and short-chain fatty acid production
- positively modulates colonic microflora
- reduces hyperlipidemia, hypertension, and other coronary heart disease risk factors
- increases satiety and hence may contribute to weight management

Fiber is defined by its physiological impact, with many heterogenous types of fibers. Some fibers may primarily impact one of these benefits (i.e., cellulose increases fecal bulking and prevents constipation), but many fibers impact more than one of these benefits (i.e., resistant starch increases bulking, increases colonic fermentation, positively modulates colonic microflora and increases satiety and insulin sensitivity). The beneficial effects of high fiber diets are the summation of the effects of the different types of fiber present in the diet and also other components of such diets.

Defining fiber physiologically allows recognition of indigestible carbohydrates with structures and physiological properties similar to those of naturally occurring dietary fibers.

== Fermentation ==
The Cereals & Grains Association has defined soluble fiber as "the edible parts of plants or similar carbohydrates resistant to digestion and absorption in the human small intestine with complete or partial fermentation in the large intestine."

In this definition, "edible parts of plants" indicates that some parts of a plant that are eaten – skin, pulp, seeds, stems, leaves, roots – contain fiber. Both insoluble and soluble sources are in those plant components. "Carbohydrates" refers to complex carbohydrates, such as long-chained sugars also called starch, oligosaccharides, or polysaccharides, which are sources of soluble fermentable fiber. "Resistant to digestion and absorption in the human small intestine" refers to compounds that are not digested by gastric acid and digestive enzymes in the stomach and small intestine, preventing the digesting animal from utilizing the compounds for energy. A food resistant to this process is undigested, as insoluble and soluble fibers are. They pass to the large intestine only affected by their absorption of water (insoluble fiber) or dissolution in water (soluble fiber). "Complete or partial fermentation in the large intestine" describes the digestive processes of the large intestine, which comprises a segment called the colon within which additional nutrient absorption occurs through the process of fermentation. Fermentation occurs through the action of colonic bacteria on the food mass, producing gases and short-chain fatty acids. These short-chain fatty acids have been shown to have significant health properties. They include butyric, acetic (ethanoic), propionic, and valeric acids.

As an example of fermentation, shorter-chain carbohydrates (a type of fiber found in legumes) cannot be digested, but are changed via fermentation in the colon into short-chain fatty acids and gases (which are typically expelled as flatulence).

According to a 2002 journal article, fiber compounds with partial or low fermentability include:

- cellulose, a polysaccharide
- methyl cellulose
- hemicellulose, a polysaccharide
- lignans, a group of phytoestrogens
- plant waxes

fiber compounds with high fermentability include:

- resistant starches
- beta-glucans, a group of polysaccharides
- pectins, a group of heteropolysaccharides
- natural gums, a group of polysaccharides
- inulins, a group of polysaccharides
- oligosaccharides

== Short-chain fatty acids ==
When fermentable fiber is fermented, short-chain fatty acids (SCFA) are produced. SCFAs are involved in numerous physiological processes promoting health, including:

- stabilize blood glucose levels by acting on pancreatic insulin release and liver control of glycogen breakdown
- stimulate gene expression of glucose transporters in the intestinal mucosa, regulating glucose absorption
- provide nourishment of colonocytes, particularly by the SCFA butyrate
- suppress cholesterol synthesis by the liver and reduce blood levels of LDL cholesterol and triglycerides responsible for atherosclerosis
- lower colonic pH (i.e., raises the acidity level in the colon) which protects the lining from formation of colonic polyps and increases absorption of dietary minerals
- stimulate production of T helper cells, antibodies, leukocytes, cytokines, and lymph mechanisms having crucial roles in immune protection
- improve barrier properties of the colonic mucosal layer, inhibiting inflammatory and adhesion irritants, contributing to immune functions

SCFAs that are absorbed by the colonic mucosa pass through the colonic wall into the portal circulation (supplying the liver), and the liver transports them into the general circulatory system.

Overall, SCFAs affect major regulatory systems, such as blood glucose and lipid levels, the colonic environment, and intestinal immune functions.

The major SCFAs in humans are butyrate, propionate, and acetate, where butyrate is the major energy source for colonocytes, propionate is destined for uptake by the liver, and acetate enters the peripheral circulation to be metabolized by peripheral tissues.

== FDA-approved health claims ==
The FDA allows manufacturers of foods containing 1.7 g per serving of psyllium husk soluble fiber or 0.75 g of oat or barley soluble fiber as beta-glucans to claim that regular consumption may reduce the risk of heart disease.

The FDA statement template for making this claim is:

Soluble fiber from foods such as [name of soluble fiber source, and, if desired, name of food product], as part of a diet low in saturated fat and cholesterol, may reduce the risk of heart disease. A serving of [name of food product] supplies __ grams of the [necessary daily dietary intake for the benefit] soluble fiber from [name of soluble fiber source] necessary per day to have this effect.

Eligible sources of soluble fiber providing beta-glucan include:

- Oat bran
- Rolled oats
- Whole oat flour
- Oatrim
- Whole grain barley and dry milled barley
- Soluble fiber from psyllium husk with purity of no less than 95%

The allowed label may state that diets low in saturated fat and cholesterol and that include soluble fiber from certain of the above foods "may" or "might" reduce the risk of heart disease.

As discussed in FDA regulation 21 CFR 101.81, the daily dietary intake levels of soluble fiber from sources listed above associated with reduced risk of coronary heart disease are:

- 3 g or more per day of beta-glucan soluble fiber from either whole oats or barley, or a combination of whole oats and barley
- 7 g or more per day of soluble fiber from psyllium seed husk.

Soluble fiber from consuming grains is included in other allowed health claims for lowering risk of some types of cancer and heart disease by consuming fruit and vegetables (21 CFR 101.76, 101.77, and 101.78).

In December 2016, the FDA approved a qualified health claim that consuming resistant starch from high-amylose corn may reduce the risk of type 2 diabetes due to its effect of increasing insulin sensitivity. The allowed claim specified: "High-amylose maize resistant starch may reduce the risk of type 2 diabetes. The FDA has concluded that there is limited scientific evidence for this claim." In 2018, the FDA released further guidance on the labeling of isolated or synthetic dietary fiber to clarify how different types of dietary fiber should be classified.

== See also ==
- Essential nutrient – Substance that an organism uses to live
- List of diets
- List of macronutrients
- List of micronutrients
- List of phytochemicals in food
- Low-fiber/low-residue diet – Diet that limits stool
