= Joel Fuhrman =

American celebrity doctor (born 1953)

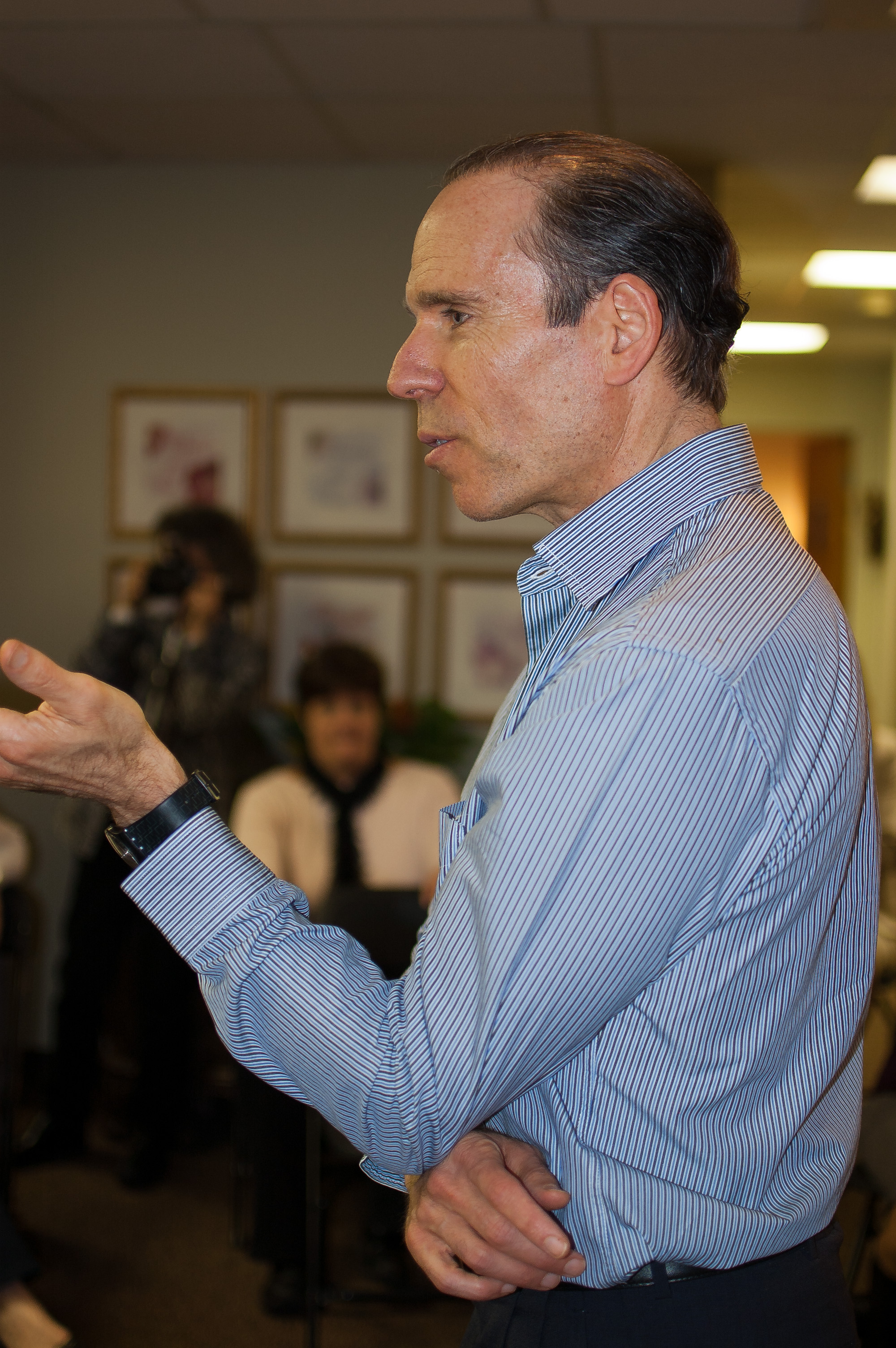
- Joel Fuhrman, May 2011
- Born: December 2, 1953 (age 72); New York City, United States
- Other name: Joel H. Fuhrman
- Education: University of Pennsylvania School of Medicine (M.D.)
- Occupations: Family physician, author
- Known for: Nutritarian diet, ANDI, micronutrient-rich diet
- Notable work: Eat to Live; The End of Diabetes; Eat for Health: Lose Weight; Keep It Off and Look Younger; Live Longer.
- Spouse: Lisa
- Children: Sean, Jenna
- Website: drfuhrman.com

Joel Fuhrman (born December 2, 1953) is an American celebrity doctor who advocates a plant-based diet termed the "nutritarian" diet which emphasizes nutrient-dense foods. His practice is based on his nutrition-based approach to obesity and chronic disease, as well as promoting his products and books. He has written books promoting his dietary approaches including the bestsellers Eat to Live, Super Immunity, The Eat to Live Cookbook, The End of Dieting (2016) and The End of Heart Disease (2016). He sells a related line of nutrition-related products.

== Life and career ==
Fuhrman was born in New York City, on December 2, 1953. He is Jewish. He was a competitor in the amateur figure skating circuit. He was a member of the US World Figure Skating Team and placed second in the US National Pairs Championship in 1973. In 1973, he suffered a heel injury which prevented him from competing. Fuhrman claims that an alternative medicine therapy recommended by a naturopath helped speed his recovery, and led him to become interested in alternative medicine. He came in 3rd place at the 1976 World Professional Pairs Skating Championship in Jaca, Spain, skating with his sister, Gale Fuhrman, but due to short-term massive muscle loss from fasting was unable to make the Olympic team. In 1988, he graduated from the University of Pennsylvania School of Medicine. Fuhrman is a board-certified family physician and serves as Director of Research for the Nutritional Research Foundation.

== Diet and health ==
=== Nutritarian diet ===
Fuhrman has advocated eating at least one pound of raw vegetables and another pound of cooked vegetables each day with an emphasis on green vegetables along with beans, onions, mushrooms, berries, nuts and seeds. He also recommends eating at least one cup of beans a day to benefit from the resistant starch and increased satiety. The Nutritarian diet encourages whole plant foods and restricts dairy products, meat, snacks between meals, fruit juice, vegetable oils and processed foods.

Furhman's Nutritarian diet excludes dairy and meat for six weeks, but after this period a small amount of chicken and fish can be eaten. Fuhrman also allows a limited amount of low-fat dairy products, olive oil and refined carbohydrates on the diet after six weeks. If animal products are not added back into the diet, Furhman recommends vitamin B_{12}, vitamin D and omega 3 supplements. On the Nutritarian diet, dairy products, eggs and fish are to make up less than 10% of calories whilst legumes make between 10% and 40% and raw and cooked vegetables make between 30% and 60% of calories.

=== Nutrient density ===
Fuhrman popularized the notion of nutrient density in what he calls the Health Equation: Health = Nutrients/Calories (abbreviated as H = N/C). Peter Lipson, a physician and writer on alternative medicine, has been heavily critical of Fuhrman's health equation, writing that since its terms cannot be quantified, it is "nothing more than a parlor trick". Fuhrman created what he calls the "Aggregate Nutrient Density Index" or ANDI, a ranking of foods based on his claims of micronutrient concentration and kale is at the top of this list. Whole Foods began using the scores as a marketing project and reported that the sales of high scoring foods "skyrocketed".

=== Criticism ===
Fuhrman has heavily marketed his products and his infomercials have "become a staple during the self-improvement bloc of PBS pledge drives." In the October 2012 edition of Men's Journal, Mark Adams stated that Fuhrman "preaches something closer to fruitarianism or Christian Science than to conventional medical wisdom". Adams also reported that Fuhrman believes that the flu vaccine "isn't effective at all". David Gorski has commented that Fuhrman has promoted a vitalistic view of food and the pseudoscientific idea of detoxification.

Dietitian Carolyn Williams has described Fuhrman's Nutritarian diet as a fad diet. According to Williams "This can be helpful for people who feel stuck in their weight loss journey and want to totally reset or detox their diet following a holiday or vacation. Although this diet is marketed as an eating pattern, it is essentially a fad diet. Those who do try this diet should go into it knowing that it is not sustainable for everyone long-term, and is only a temporary quick fix to lose weight."

Harriet Hall, a founder of Science-Based Medicine, a website owned and operated by the New England Skeptical Society, reviewed Fuhrman's Nutritarian diet and commented that he tends to incorrectly assume association studies show causation and that his diet has not been tested in controlled trials. Hall stated that "Fuhrman makes extraordinary claims for the Nutritarian diet, but extraordinary claims must be supported by extraordinary evidence, and the evidence he presents is far from compelling."

== Books ==
- Fasting and Eating for Health: A Medical Doctor's Program for Conquering Disease (1995) ISBN 978-0312187194
- Eat to Live: The Amazing Nutrient-Rich Program for Fast and Sustained Weight Loss (2003) ISBN 978-0316120913
- Disease-Proof Your Child: Feeding Kids Right (2006) ISBN 978-0312338084
- Eat for Health: Lose Weight, Keep It off, Look Younger, Live Longer (2008) ISBN 978-0983795223
- The End of Diabetes: The Eat to Live Plan to Prevent and Reverse Diabetes (2012) ISBN 978-0062219985
- Super Immunity: The Essential Nutrition Guide for Boosting Your Body's Defenses to Live Longer, Stronger, and Disease Free (2013) ISBN 9780062080653
- The End of Dieting: How to Live for Life (2014) ISBN 978-0062249326
- The End of Heart Disease: the eat to live plan to prevent and reverse heart disease (2016) ISBN 978-0062249357
- Eat to Live Quick and Easy Cookbook: 131 Delicious Recipes for Fast and Sustained Weight Loss, Reversing Disease, and Lifelong Health (2017) ISBN 978-0062684950
- Fast Food Genocide: How Processed Food Is Killing Us and What We Can Do about It (2017) ISBN 978-0062571212
- Transformation 20 - Blood Pressure and Cholesterol (2018) ISBN 9780999223529
- Eat for Life: The Breakthrough Nutrient-Rich Program for Longevity, Disease Reversal, and Sustained Weight Loss (2020) ISBN 978-0062249319

== See also ==
- Neal D. Barnard
- T. Colin Campbell
- Michael Greger
- Michael Klaper
- John A. McDougall
- Michael Pollan
