= Food Compass =

Food Compass is a nutrient profiling system which ranks foods based on their healthfulness using characteristics that impact health in positive or negative ways. It was developed by the Friedman School of Nutrition Science and Policy at Tufts University.
