= Empty calories =

Calories lacking other nutritional value

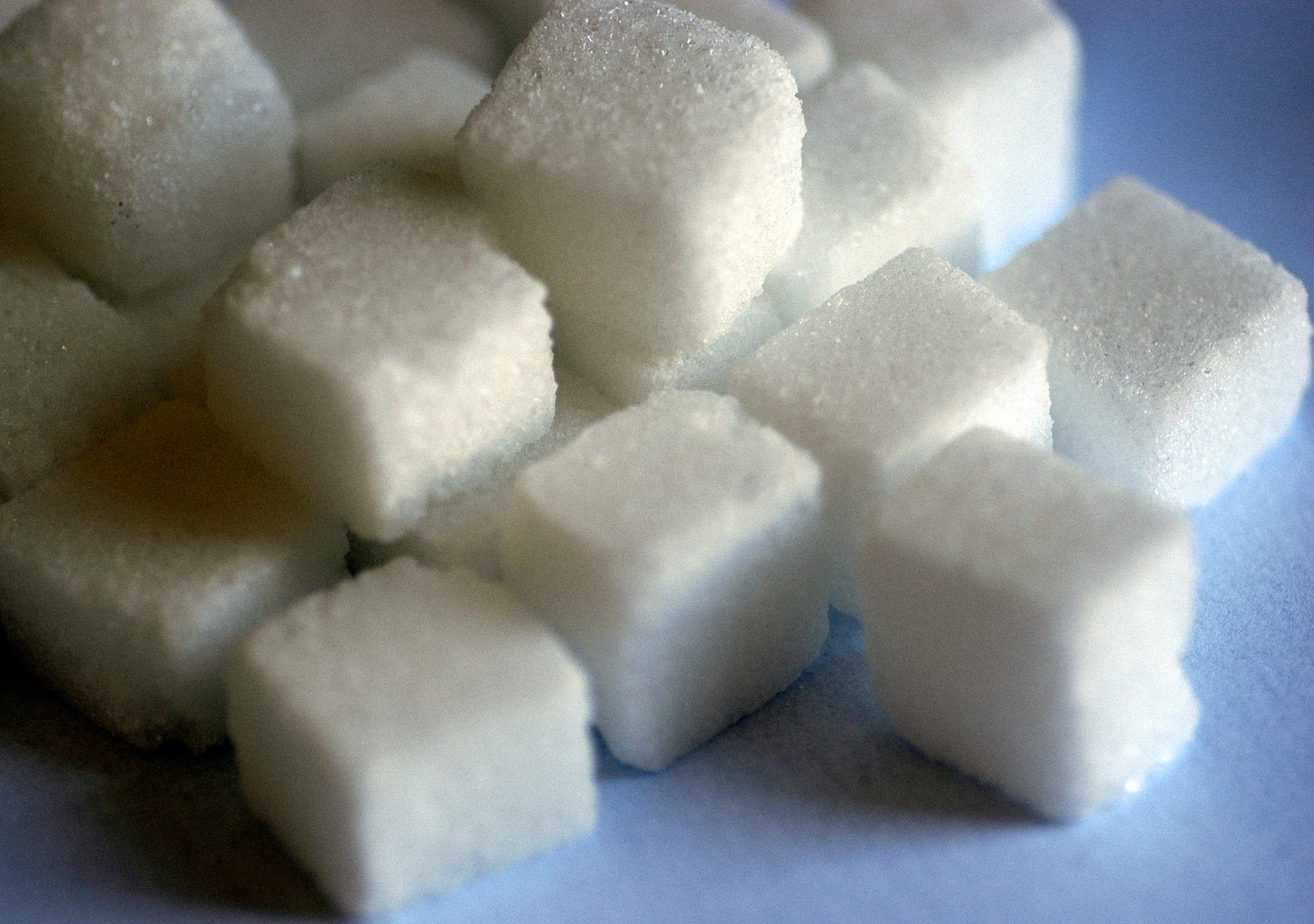
Granulated sugar provides energy in the form of calories, but has no other nutritional value.

In human nutrition, empty calories are calories found in foods and beverages (including alcohol) that are composed primarily or solely of calorie-rich macronutrients such as sugars and fats, but contain little or no micronutrients, fibre, or protein. Foods composed mostly of empty calories have low nutrient density, meaning few other nutrients relative to their energy content. Empty calories are not directly harmful but are more difficult to fit into a diet that is both balanced and within total daily energy expenditure, and so readily create an unhealthy diet.

== Research ==
The lack of complete nutrition found in high energy foods was first scientifically tested by French physiologist François Magendie, who experimented on dogs and described the process in his book Précis élémentaire de Physiologie. He demonstrated that only eating sugar, olive oil, or butter could cause his test animals to die within 30 to 40 days.

== Examples ==
The following foods are often considered to contain mostly empty calories and commonly lead to body weight gain.

- Sugar: such as cakes, cookies, sweets, candy, soft drinks, frozen desserts such as ice cream and milkshakes, fruit-flavored sweet beverages, and other foods containing mostly added sugars, including high-fructose corn syrup.
- Fat: such as margarine, shortening, artificial trans fats, other fats, and oils and foods high in them such as potato chips and most other deep fried and processed foods and snack products.
- Alcohol: such as beer, wine, spirits, and other alcoholic beverages. While moderate amounts can lead to body weight gain, chronic consumption of large amounts of alcohol can lead to body weight loss because alcoholic liver disease (ALD) is characterized by an increased metabolic rate and impaired muscle protein synthesis, resulting in sarcopenia.

== Impact on other nutrients ==
A diet high in added sugar typically alters behavior to reduce consumption of foods that contain essential nutrients. One study reported that when there was increased consumption of added sugars, nutrients at most risk for deficiency were magnesium and vitamins A, C, E. Intake of these nutrients dropped with each 5% increase in added sugar intake.

A diet high in alcohol can have the same effect, although in this case the nutrients at particular risk of deficiency are zinc, vitamin D, thiamine, folate, cyanocobalamin, and selenium. People with ALD also develop sarcopenia, but it is not clear if this is due to chronic low protein intake or the disease, which is known to inhibit muscle protein synthesis.

== Threshold for health impact ==
Typically, 90% of energy is expended simply to maintain current weight while idle, but in extremely active individuals physical exercise must be balanced with food intake to maintain healthy body weight. Sedentary individuals and those eating less to lose weight will be subject to malnutrition if they eat food primarily composed of empty calories. In contrast, people who engage in heavier physical activity need more food energy as fuel and can have a larger amount of calorie-rich, essential nutrient-poor foods. Dietitians and other healthcare professionals can prevent malnutrition by designing eating programs and recommending dietary modifications according to each patient's needs.

The USDA advises the following levels of empty calorie consumption as an upper limit for individuals who engage in 30 minutes or less of moderate exercise daily.

Gender	Age (years)	Total daily calorie needs	Daily limit for empty calories
Male	2–3	1000	135
Male	4–8	1200–1400	120
Male	9–13	1800	160
Male	14–18	2200	265
Male	19–30	2400	330
Male	31–50	2200	265
Male	51+	2000	260
Female	2–3	1000	135
Female	4–8	1200–1400	120
Female	9–13	1600	120
Female	14–18	1800	160
Female	19–30	2000	260
Female	31–50	1800	160
Female	51+	1600	120

== See also ==
- Junk food
- Satiety value
- Whole food
