= List of macronutrients =

Daily caloric supply derived from carbohydrates protein and fat

This list is a categorization of the most common food components based on their macronutrients. Macronutrients can refer to the chemical substances that humans consume in the largest quantities (See Nutrient);

== Macronutrients that provide energy ==
There are three principal classes of macronutrients: carbohydrate, protein and fat. Macronutrients are defined as a class of chemical compounds which humans consume in relatively large quantities compared to vitamins and minerals which provide humans with energy. Fat has a food energy content of 38 kilojoules per gram (9 kilocalories per gram) proteins and carbohydrates 17 kJ/g (4 kcal/g).

Water makes up a large proportion of the total mass ingested as part of a normal diet but it does not provide any nutritional value. Ethanol provides calories but there is no requirement for ethanol as an essential nutrient. Even though macros and calories are different concepts, they are dependent on each other. While macros refer to the three types of main nutrients that you need - protein, carbohydrate, and fat, calories, on the other hand, refer to the nutritional value of your meal.

=== Carbohydrates ===
- Glucose
- Sucrose
- Ribose
- Amylose (a major component of starch)
- Amylopectin
- Maltose
- Galactose
- Fructose
- Lactose

=== Protein ===
Essential and non-essential amino acids

- Alanine
- Arginine
- Aspartic acid (aspartate)
- Asparagine
- Cysteine
- Glutamic acid
- Glutamine
- Glycine
- Histidine
- Isoleucine
- Leucine
- Lysine
- Methionine
- Phenylalanine
- Proline
- Serine
- Threonine
- Tryptophan
- Tyrosine
- Valine

=== Fats ===
==== Saturated (i.e., stable) fatty acids ====
- Acetic acid (C2)
- Propionic acid (C3)
- Butyric acid (C4)
- Valeric acid (C5)
- Caproic acid (C6)
- Caprylic acid (C8)
- Capric acid (C10)
- Lauric acid (C12)
- Myristic acid (C14)
- Pentadecanoic acid (C15)
- Palmitic acid (C16)
- Margaric acid (C17)
- Stearic acid (C18)
- Arachidic acid (C20)
- Behenic acid (C22)
- Lignoceric acid (C24)
- Cerotic acid (C26)

==== Monounsaturated (i.e., semi-stable) fatty acids ====
- Myristoleic acid
- Oleic acid
- Eicosenoic acids
- Erucic acid
- Nervonic acid

==== Polyunsaturated (i.e., unstable) fatty acids ====
- Linoleic acid (LA) - an essential fatty acid
- α-Linolenic acid (ALA) - an essential fatty acid
- Stearidonic acid (SDA)
- Gamma-Linolenic acid (GLA)
- Arachidonic acid (AA)
- Eicosatetraenoic acid (ETA)
- Timnodonic acid (EPA)
- Clupanodonic acid (DPA)
- Cervonic acid (DHA)

==== Essential fatty acids ====
- α-Linolenic acid ALA (18:3) omega-3 fatty acid
- Linoleic acid LA (18:2) omega-6 fatty acid

== Macronutrients that do not provide energy ==
=== Oxygen ===
Oxygen is essential for life.

=== Water ===
Water is also essential for life. It provides the medium in which all metabolic processes proceed. It is necessary for the absorption of macronutrients and micronutrients but it provides no nutritional energy.

=== Fibre ===
Dietary fibre from fruits, vegetables and grain foods. Insoluble dietary fibre is not absorbed in the human digestive tract but is important in maintaining the bulk of a bowel movement to avoid constipation. Soluble fibre can be metabolized by bacteria residing in the large intestine. Soluble fibre is marketed as serving a prebiotic function with claims for promoting "healthy" intestinal bacteria. Bacterial metabolism of soluble fibre also produces short-chain fatty acids like butyric acid which may be absorbed into intestinal cells as a source of food energy.

- cellulose
- methyl cellulose
- hemicellulose
- lignans
- plant waxes
- resistant starches
- beta-glucans
- pectins
- natural gums
- inulin
- oligosaccharides

== See also ==
- Nutrient
- Essential nutrient
- List of micronutrients
- List of phytochemicals in food
