= Adam Drewnowski =

Adam Drewnowski (born 1948 in Warsaw, Poland) is a professor of epidemiology at the University of Washington and the director of the Center for Public Health Nutrition at the University's School of Public Health. Son of economics professor Jan Drewnowski.

== Education ==
Drewnowski received his MA from Oxford University (1971) and PhD from Rockefeller University in psychology (1977).

== Scientific career ==
After postdoctoral work at the University of Toronto, Drewnowski became an assistant professor at Rockefeller University, then a professor of public health and Director of the Program in Human Nutrition at the School of Public Health at the University of Michigan. While there he researched a possible drug to block cravings for chocolate, since these cravings usually precipitate eating binges. He joined the University of Washington in 1998.

In 2008, Drewnowski led the development of the Nutrient Rich Foods Index, which ranks foods based on their nutrient density. He has also studied the relationship between poverty and being more likely to become obese, and the relationship between the per-calorie price of food and the amount of key nutrients they contain.

== Awards ==
In May 2025, he was awarded an Honorary Doctorate from McGill University.
