= Eat to Live =

2003 book by Joel Fuhrman

Eat to Live: The Amazing Nutrient-Rich Program for Fast and Sustained Weight Loss
- First edition
- Author: Joel Fuhrman
- Publisher: Little, Brown and Company (Hachette)
- Publication date: 2003
- Pages: 380
- ISBN: 9780316120913

Eat to Live: The Amazing Nutrient-Rich Program for Fast and Sustained Weight Loss is a book written in 2003 by Joel Fuhrman. A revised version was released in 2011. The book offers a formula for weight loss that health equals nutrients divided by calories. The diet is vegetarian, vegan, low-salt, low-fat, and gluten-free for the first six weeks, after which animal products may be added. The diet is considered "extremely restrictive" for its restrictions against snacks, sugar, and oils.
