= Overall nutritional quality index =

Nutritional rating system for food

The overall nutritional quality index was a nutritional rating system developed at the Yale-Griffin Prevention Research Center in 2008. A proprietary algorithm assigned foods a score between 1 and 100 intended to reflect the overall nutritional value a portion of the given food provided. The system was marketed commercially as NuVal by NuVal, LLC, a joint venture with Topco Associates. Over 1600 grocery stores in the United States placed NuVal scores on product shelf tags next to the price. The commercial product was discontinued in 2017 amid accusations of conflicts of interest and criticism of NuVal LLC's refusal to publish the algorithm. Either of which may have contributed to some inconsistencies in scoring where certain processed foods scored higher than, for instance, canned fruits and vegetables.

== Description ==
The algorithm considers thirty nutrient factors, like the relative portions of vitamins, sugar, saturated fat, and trans fats and the quality of the protein and fat, and produces a score from one to 100. Higher scores represent greater overall nutritional value. However, the actual algorithm, including the relative weights of the nutrients, was never disclosed to the public.

Broccoli, blueberries, okra, oranges, and green beans were some foods that received the best score (100) while ice pops and soft drinks received the worst (1).

== Selected NuVal scores ==
Food name	ONQI
Spinach	100
Broccoli	100
Blueberries	100
Okra	100
Orange	100
Green beans	100
Pineapple	99
Radish	99
Summer squash	98
Apple	96
Green cabbage	96
Tomato	96
Clementine	94
Watermelon	94
Mango	93
Red onions	93
Fresh figs	91
Grapes	91
Banana	91
Milk (skimmed)	91
Avocado	89
Oatmeal	88
Atlantic salmon fillet	87
Atlantic halibut fillet	82
Catfish fillet	82
Cod fillet	82
Tilapia fillet	82
Oysters	81
Swordfish steak	81
Prawns	75
Shrimp	75
Clams	71
Monkfish fillet	64
Milk (whole)	52
Scallops	51
Turbot fillet	51
Pasta	50
Tinned peas	49
Turkey breast (skinless)	48
Prunes	45
Chicken breast (boneless)	39
Orange juice	39
Lobster	36
Pork tenderloin	35
Flank steak (Beef)	34
Turkey breast	31
Veal chop	31
Veal leg cutlet	31
Beef tenderloin	30
Chicken drumstick	30
Pork chop (boneless centre cut)	28
Chicken wings	28
Lamb chops (loin)	28
Bacon	28
Leg of lamb	28
Ham (whole)	27
Raisins	26
Green olives	24
Bagel	23
Peanut butter	23
Condensed cream of broccoli soup	21
Salted, dry-roasted peanuts	21
Fried egg	18
Swiss cheese	17
Diet fizzy drinks	15
Non-streaky bacon	13
Pretzel sticks	11
Dark chocolate	10
White bread	9
Salami	7
Hot dog	5
Cheese puffs	4
Milk chocolate	3
Apple pie	2
Crackers	2
Fizzy drinks	1
Popsicle	1

== See also ==
- Nutrient density
