= Ammonium alginate =

Names
- Other names E403

Identifiers
| CAS Number | 9005-34-9 |
| ECHA InfoCard | 100.124.851 |
| E number | E403 (thickeners, ...) |
| PubChem CID | 135314377 |
| UNII | Q9QKJ39Q3X |
| CompTox Dashboard (EPA) | DTXSID301010952 |

Properties
| Chemical formula | C_{6}H_{11}NO_{6} |
| Molar mass | 193.155 g·mol^{−1} |
| Appearance | brown solid |
| Density | 1.79 g/cm^{3} |
| Boiling point | 300 °C |
| Solubility in water | soluble |
- Except where otherwise noted, data are given for materials in their standard state (at 25 °C [77 °F], 100 kPa). Infobox references

Ammonium alginate is a chemical compound with the chemical formula NH_{4}C_{6}H_{7}O_{6}.This is an organic ammonium salt of alginic acid. This is also a natural polyuronide found in certain brown algae.

== Physical properties ==
The compound exists in white to yellowish brown filamentous, grainy, granular, or powdered forms.

Soluble in water.

== Uses ==
The compound is used in the food industry as a stabilizer, thickener, gelling agent, emulsifier (food additive E403).
