= Nutrient =

Substance that an organism uses to live

A nutrient is a substance used by an organism to survive, grow and reproduce. The requirement for dietary nutrient intake applies to animals, plants, fungi and protists. Nutrients can be incorporated into cells for metabolic purposes or excreted by cells to create non-cellular structures such as hair, scales, feathers, or exoskeletons. Some nutrients can be metabolically converted into smaller molecules in the process of releasing energy such as for carbohydrates, lipids, proteins and fermentation products (ethanol or vinegar) leading to end-products of water and carbon dioxide. All organisms require water. Essential nutrients for animals are the energy sources, some of the amino acids that are combined to create proteins, a subset of fatty acids, vitamins and certain minerals. Plants require more diverse minerals absorbed through roots, plus carbon dioxide and oxygen absorbed through leaves. Fungi live on dead or living organic matter and meet nutrient needs from their host.

Different types of organisms have different essential nutrients. Ascorbic acid (vitamin C) is essential to humans and some animal species but most other animals and many plants are able to synthesize it. Nutrients may be organic or inorganic: organic compounds include most compounds containing carbon, while all other chemicals are inorganic. Inorganic nutrients include iron, selenium, and zinc, while organic nutrients include protein, fats, sugars and vitamins.

A classification used primarily to describe nutrient needs of animals divides nutrients into macronutrients and micronutrients. Consumed in relatively large amounts (grams or ounces), macronutrients (carbohydrates, fats, proteins, water) are primarily used to generate energy or to incorporate into tissues for growth and repair. Micronutrients are needed in smaller amounts (milligrams or micrograms); they have subtle biochemical and physiological roles in cellular processes, like vascular functions or nerve conduction. Inadequate consumption of essential nutrients, or diseases that interfere with absorption, result in a deficiency state that compromises growth, survival, and reproduction. Consumer advisories for dietary nutrient intakes, such as the United States Dietary Reference Intake, are based on the amount required to prevent deficiency and provide macronutrient and micronutrient guides for both lower and upper limits of intake. In many countries, regulations require that food product labels display information about the amount of any macronutrients and micronutrients present in the food in significant quantities. Nutrients in larger quantities than the body needs may have harmful effects. Edible plants also contain thousands of compounds generally called phytochemicals which have unknown effects on disease or health including a diverse class with non-nutrient status called polyphenols which remain poorly understood as of 2024.

== Types ==
=== Macronutrients ===
Macronutrients are defined in several ways.

- The chemical elements humans consume in the largest quantities are carbon, hydrogen, nitrogen, oxygen, phosphorus, and sulphur, summarized as CHNOPS.
- The chemical compounds that humans consume in the largest quantities and provide bulk energy are classified as carbohydrates, proteins, and fats. Water must be also consumed in large quantities but does not provide caloric value.
- Calcium, sodium, potassium, magnesium, and chloride ions, along with phosphorus and sulfur, are listed with macronutrients because they are required in large quantities compared to micronutrients, i.e., vitamins and other minerals, the latter often described as trace or ultratrace minerals.

Macronutrients provide energy:

- Carbohydrates are compounds made up of types of sugar. Carbohydrates are classified according to their number of sugar units: monosaccharides (such as glucose and fructose), disaccharides (such as sucrose and lactose), oligosaccharides, and polysaccharides (such as starch, glycogen, and cellulose).
- Proteins are organic compounds that consist of amino acids joined by peptide bonds. Since the body cannot manufacture some of the amino acids (termed essential amino acids), the diet must supply them. Through digestion, proteins are broken down by proteases back into free amino acids.
- Fats consist of a glycerin molecule with three fatty acids attached. Fatty acid molecules contain a -COOH group attached to unbranched hydrocarbon chains connected by single bonds alone (saturated fatty acids) or by both double and single bonds (unsaturated fatty acids). Fats are needed for construction and maintenance of cell membranes, to maintain a stable body temperature, and to sustain the health of skin and hair. Because the body does not manufacture certain fatty acids (termed essential fatty acids), they must be obtained through one's diet.

Biomolecule	Kilocalories per 1 gram
Protein	4
Carbohydrate	4
Ethanol	7
Fat	9

=== Micronutrients ===
Micronutrients are essential dietary elements required in varying quantities throughout life to serve metabolic and physiological functions.

- Dietary minerals, such as potassium, sodium, and iron, are elements native to Earth, and cannot be synthesized. They are required in the diet in microgram or milligram amounts. As plants obtain minerals from the soil, dietary minerals derive directly from plants consumed or indirectly from edible animal sources.
- Vitamins are organic compounds required in microgram or milligram amounts. The importance of each dietary vitamin was first established when it was determined that a disease would develop if that vitamin was absent from the diet.

== Essentiality ==
=== Essential nutrients ===
An essential nutrient is a nutrient required for normal physiological function that cannot be synthesized in the body – either at all or in sufficient quantities – and thus must be obtained from a dietary source. Apart from water, which is universally required for the maintenance of homeostasis in mammals, essential nutrients are indispensable for various cellular metabolic processes and for the maintenance and function of tissues and organs. The nutrients considered essential for humans comprise nine amino acids, two fatty acids, thirteen vitamins, fourteen minerals, and choline. In addition, there are several molecules that are considered conditionally essential nutrients since they are indispensable in certain developmental and pathological states.

==== Amino acids ====
An essential amino acid is an amino acid that is required by an organism but cannot be synthesized de novo by it, and therefore must be supplied in its diet. Out of the twenty standard protein-producing amino acids, nine cannot be endogenously synthesized by humans: phenylalanine, valine, threonine, tryptophan, methionine, leucine, isoleucine, lysine, and histidine.

==== Fatty acids ====
Essential fatty acids (EFAs) are fatty acids that humans and other animals must ingest because the body requires them for good health but cannot synthesize them. Only two fatty acids are known to be essential for humans: alpha-linolenic acid (an omega-3 fatty acid) and linoleic acid (an omega-6 fatty acid).

==== Vitamins and vitamers ====
Vitamins occur in a variety of related forms known as vitamers. The vitamers of a given vitamin perform the functions of that vitamin and prevent symptoms of deficiency of that vitamin. Vitamins are those essential organic molecules that are not classified as amino acids or fatty acids. They commonly function as enzymatic cofactors, metabolic regulators or antioxidants. Humans require thirteen vitamins in their diet, most of which are actually groups of related molecules (e.g. vitamin E includes tocopherols and tocotrienols): vitamins A, C, D, E, K, thiamine (B_{1}), riboflavin (B_{2}), niacin (B_{3}), pantothenic acid (B_{5}), pyridoxine (B_{6}), biotin (B_{7}), folate (B_{9}), and cobalamin (B_{12}). The requirement for vitamin D is conditional, as people who get sufficient exposure to ultraviolet light, either from the sun or an artificial source, synthesize vitamin D in the skin.

==== Minerals ====
Minerals are the exogenous chemical elements indispensable for life. Although the four elements carbon, hydrogen, oxygen, and nitrogen (CHON) are essential for life, they are so plentiful in food and drink that these are not considered nutrients and there are no recommended intakes for these as minerals. The need for nitrogen is addressed by requirements set for protein, which is composed of nitrogen-containing amino acids. Sulfur is essential, but again does not have a recommended intake. Instead, recommended intakes are identified for the sulfur-containing amino acids methionine and cysteine.

The essential nutrient trace elements for humans, listed in order of recommended dietary allowance (expressed as a mass), are potassium, chloride, sodium, calcium, phosphorus, magnesium, iron, zinc, manganese, copper, iodine, chromium, molybdenum, and selenium. Additionally, cobalt is a component of vitamin B_{12} which is essential. There are other minerals which are essential for some plants and animals, but may or may not be essential for humans, such as boron and silicon.

==== Choline ====
Choline is an essential nutrient. The cholines are a family of water-soluble quaternary ammonium compounds. Choline is the parent compound of the cholines class, consisting of ethanolamine having three methyl substituents attached to the amino function. Healthy humans fed artificially composed diets that are deficient in choline develop fatty liver, liver damage, and muscle damage. Choline was not initially classified as essential because the human body can produce choline in small amounts through phosphatidylcholine metabolism.

=== Conditionally essential ===
Conditionally essential nutrients are certain organic molecules that can normally be synthesized by an organism, but under certain conditions in insufficient quantities. In humans, such conditions include premature birth, limited nutrient intake, rapid growth, and certain disease states. Inositol, taurine, arginine, glutamine and nucleotides are classified as conditionally essential and are particularly important in neonatal diet and metabolism.

=== Non-essential ===
Non-essential nutrients are substances within foods that can have a significant impact on health. Dietary fiber is not absorbed in the human digestive tract. Soluble fiber is metabolized to butyrate and other short-chain fatty acids by bacteria residing in the large intestine. Soluble fiber is marketed as serving a prebiotic function with claims for promoting "healthy" intestinal bacteria.

=== Non-nutrients ===
Ethanol (C_{2}H_{5}OH) is not an essential nutrient, but it does supply approximately 29 kilojoules (7 kilocalories) of food energy per gram. For spirits (vodka, gin, rum, etc.) a standard serving in the United States is 44 millilitres (1 1/2 US fluid ounces), which at 40% ethanol (80 proof) would be 14 grams and 410 kJ (98 kcal). At 50% alcohol, this would be 17.5 g and 513 kJ (122.5 kcal). Wine and beer contain a similar amount of ethanol in servings of 150 and 350 mL (5 and 12 US fl oz), respectively, but these beverages also contribute to food energy intake from components other than ethanol. A 150 mL (5 US fl oz) serving of wine contains 420 to 540 kJ (100 to 130 kcal). A 350 mL (12 US fl oz) serving of beer contains 400 to 840 kJ (95 to 200 kcal).

According to the U.S. Department of Agriculture, based on NHANES 2013–2014 surveys, women ages 20 and up consume on average 6.8 grams of alcohol per day and men consume on average 15.5 grams per day. Ignoring the non-alcohol contribution of those beverages, the average ethanol contributions to daily food energy intake are 200 and 450 kJ (48 and 108 kcal), respectively. Alcoholic beverages are considered empty calorie foods because, while providing energy, they contribute no essential nutrients.

By definition, phytochemicals include all nutritional and non-nutritional components of edible plants. Included as nutritional constituents are provitamin A carotenoids, whereas those without nutrient status are diverse polyphenols, flavonoids, and lignans that are present in numerous plant foods. Some phytochemical compounds are under preliminary research for their potential effects on human diseases and health. However, the qualification for nutrient status of compounds with poorly defined properties in vivo is that they must first be defined with a Dietary Reference Intake level to enable accurate food labeling, a condition not established for most phytochemicals that are claimed to provide antioxidant benefits.

== Deficiencies and toxicity ==
An inadequate amount of a nutrient is a deficiency. Deficiencies can be due to several causes, including an inadequacy in nutrient intake, called a dietary deficiency, or any of several conditions that interfere with the utilization of a nutrient within an organism. Some of the conditions that can interfere with nutrient utilization include problems with nutrient absorption, substances that cause a greater-than-normal need for a nutrient, conditions that cause nutrient destruction, and conditions that cause greater nutrient excretion. Nutrient toxicity occurs when excess consumption of a nutrient does harm to an organism.

In the United States and Canada, recommended dietary intake levels of essential nutrients are based on the minimum level that "will maintain a defined level of nutriture in an individual", a definition somewhat different from that used by the World Health Organization and Food and Agriculture Organization of a "basal requirement to indicate the level of intake needed to prevent pathologically relevant and clinically detectable signs of a dietary inadequacy".

In setting human nutrient guidelines, government organizations do not necessarily agree on amounts needed to avoid deficiency or maximum amounts to avoid the risk of toxicity. For example, for vitamin C, recommended intakes range from 40 mg/day in India to 155 mg/day for the European Union. The table below shows U.S. Estimated Average Requirements (EARs) and Recommended Dietary Allowances (RDAs) for vitamins and minerals, PRIs for the European Union (same concept as RDAs), followed by what three government organizations deem to be the safe upper intake. RDAs are set higher than EARs to cover people with higher-than-average needs. Adequate Intakes (AIs) are set when there is insufficient information to establish EARs and RDAs. Countries establish tolerable upper intake levels, also referred to as upper limits (ULs), based on amounts that cause adverse effects. Governments are slow to revise information of this nature. For the U.S. values, except calcium and vitamin D, all data date from 1997 to 2004.

Nutrient	U.S. EAR	Highest U.S. RDA or AI	Highest EU PRI or AI	Upper limit			Unit
Nutrient	U.S. EAR	Highest U.S. RDA or AI	Highest EU PRI or AI	U.S.	EU	Japan	Unit
Vitamin A	625	900	1300	3000	3000	2700	μg
Vitamin C	75	90	155	2000	ND	ND	mg
Vitamin D	10	15	15	100	100	100	μg
Vitamin K	NE	120	70	ND	ND	ND	μg
α-tocopherol (Vit E)	12	15	13	1000	300	650–900	mg
Thiamin (Vit B_{1})	1.0	1.2	0.1 mg/MJ	ND	ND	ND	mg
Riboflavin (Vit B_{2})	1.1	1.3	2.0	ND	ND	ND	mg
Niacin* (Vit B_{3})	12	16	1.6 mg/MJ	35	10	60-85	mg
Pantothenic acid (Vit B_{5})	NE	5	7	ND	ND	ND	mg
Vitamin B_{6}	1.1	1.3	1.8	100	25	40-60	mg
Biotin (Vit B_{7})	NE	30	45	ND	ND	ND	μg
Folate (Vit B_{9})	320	400	600	1000	1000	900-1000	μg
Cobalamin (Vit B_{12})	2.0	2.4	5.0	ND	ND	ND	μg
Choline	NE	550	520	3500	ND	ND	mg
Calcium	800	1000	1000	2500	2500	2500	mg
Chloride	NE	2300	NE	3600	ND	ND	mg
Chromium	NE	35	NE	ND	ND	ND	μg
Copper	700	900	1600	10000	5000	10000	μg
Fluoride	NE	4	3.4	10	7	____	mg
Iodine	95	150	200	1100	600	3000	μg
Iron	6	18 (females); 8 (males)	16 (females); 11 (males)	45	ND	40-45	mg
Magnesium*	350	420	350	350	250	350	mg
Manganese	NE	2.3	3.0	11	ND	11	mg
Molybdenum	34	45	65	2000	600	450-550	μg
Phosphorus	580	700	640	4000	ND	3000	mg
Potassium	NE	4700	4000	ND	ND	2700-3000	mg
Selenium	45	55	70	400	300	330-460	μg
Sodium	NE	1500	NE	2300	ND	3000-3600	mg
Zinc	9.4	11	16.3	40	25	35-45	mg

* The daily recommended amounts of niacin and magnesium are higher than the tolerable upper limit because, for both nutrients, the ULs identify the amounts that will not increase the risk of adverse effects when the nutrients are consumed as a serving of a dietary supplement. Magnesium supplementation above the UL may cause diarrhea. Supplementation with niacin above the UL may cause flushing of the face and a sensation of body warmth. Each country or regional regulatory agency decides on a safety margin below when symptoms occur so that the ULs may differ based on the source.

EAR U.S. Estimated Average Requirements.

RDA U.S. Recommended Dietary Allowances; higher for adults than children and may be even higher for pregnant or lactating women.

AI U.S. Adequate Intake; AIs are established when there is insufficient information to set EARs and RDAs.

PRI Population Reference Intake is the European Union equivalent of RDA; it is higher for adults than for children and maybe even higher for pregnant or lactating women. For Thiamin and Niacin, the PRIs are expressed as amounts per megajoule (239 kilocalories) of food energy consumed.

Upper Limit Tolerable upper intake levels.

ND ULs have not been determined.

NE EARs, PRIs, or AIs have not yet been established or will not be (EU does not consider chromium an essential nutrient).

== Plant ==
Plants absorb carbon, hydrogen, and oxygen from air and soil as carbon dioxide and water. Other nutrients are absorbed from soil (exceptions include some parasitic or carnivorous plants). Counting these, there are 17 important nutrients for plants: these are macronutrients; nitrogen (N), phosphorus (P), potassium (K), calcium (Ca), sulfur (S), magnesium (Mg), carbon (C), oxygen(O) and hydrogen (H), and the micronutrients; iron (Fe), boron (B), chlorine (Cl), manganese (Mn), zinc (Zn), copper (Cu), molybdenum (Mo) and nickel (Ni). In addition to carbon, hydrogen, and oxygen, nitrogen, phosphorus, and sulfur are also needed in relatively large quantities. Together, these six are the elemental macronutrients for all organisms. They are sourced from inorganic matter (for example, carbon dioxide, water, nitrates, phosphates, sulfates, and diatomic molecules of nitrogen and, especially, oxygen) and organic compounds such as acids, carbohydrates, lipids, proteins.

== See also ==
- Primary nutritional groups
- Food composition
- Nutrient cycle
- Nutrient density
- Nutrition
- Nutritionism
- List of macronutrients
- List of micronutrients
- List of nutrition guides
- List of phytochemicals in food
- River Continuum Concept
- Table of food nutrients
