= List of micronutrients =

Micronutrients are nutrients such as vitamins and minerals required by organisms in varying quantities throughout life to orchestrate a range of physiological functions to maintain health.

The following is a list of micronutrients used by various living organisms. For human-specific nutrients, see Mineral (nutrient).

== Minerals ==
- Calcium
- Iron
- Magnesium
- Phosphorus
- Potassium
- Sodium
- Sulfur
- Zinc

=== Trace elements ===
- Boron
- Chlorine
- Cobalt (as a component of vitamin B_{12})
- Copper
- Fluorine
- Iodine
- Manganese
- Molybdenum
- Selenium
- Silicon

== Vitamins ==
- Vitamin B complex
  - Vitamin B_{1} (thiamin)
  - Vitamin B_{2} (riboflavin)
  - Vitamin B_{3} (niacin)
  - Vitamin B_{5} (pantothenic acid)
  - Vitamin B_{6} group:
    - Pyridoxine
    - Pyridoxal-5-Phosphate
    - Pyridoxamine
  - Vitamin B_{7} (biotin)
  - Vitamin B_{9} (folate)
  - Vitamin B_{12} (cobalamin)
  - Choline
- Vitamin A (e.g. retinol (see also - provitamin A carotenoids))
- Vitamin C (Ascorbic acid)
- Vitamin D
  - Ergocalciferol
  - Cholecalciferol
- Vitamin E (tocopherols and tocotrienols)
- Vitamin K
  - Vitamin K_{1} (phylloquinone)
  - Vitamin K_{2} (menaquinone)
  - Vitamin K_{3} (menadione)
- Carotenoids (not accepted as essential nutrients)
  - Alpha carotene
  - Beta carotene
  - Cryptoxanthin
  - Lutein
  - Lycopene
  - Zeaxanthin

== See also ==
- List of macronutrients
- List of phytochemicals in food
- Nutrient
- Nutrition
