= Polyuronide =

Polyuronide is a polymeric substance which consists of uronic acid units that have glycosidic linkages which are commonly combined with monosaccharides.

== Sources ==
Polyuronide widely occurs in soil and plants (such as gums and pectic substances).

== Studies ==
There are many scientific studies about the presence of polyuronide in avocados and tomatoes. There is also a study about its occurrence in barrel cacti.

== Examples ==
- Glucoronic acid
- Galactoronic acid
