= Brian Wansink =

American consumer behavior researcher

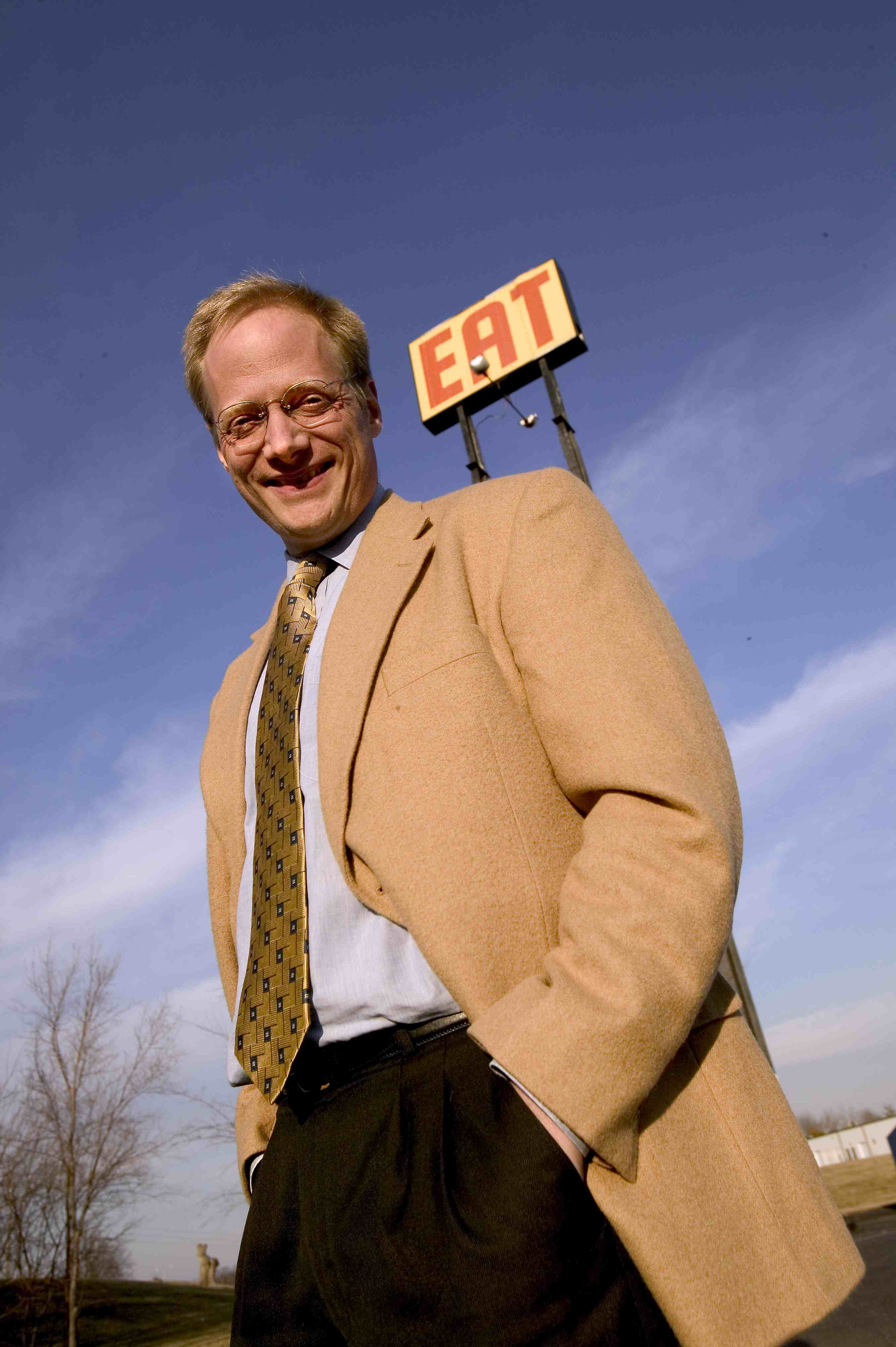
- Wansink in 1998
- Born: June 28, 1960 (age 66); Sioux City, Iowa
- Education: Wayne State College (BS); Drake University (MA); Stanford University (PhD)
- Awards: Ig Nobel Prize (2007)
- Scientific career
- Fields: consumer behavior, nutrition psychology
- Workplaces: Cornell University, University of Pennsylvania, Dartmouth College, University of Illinois at Urbana-Champaign
- Website: http://www.brianwansink.com/

Brian Wansink (born June 28, 1960) is an American former professor and researcher who worked in consumer behavior and marketing research. He was the executive director of the USDA's Center for Nutrition Policy and Promotion (CNPP) from 2007 to 2009 and held the John S. Dyson Endowed Chair in the Applied Economics and Management Department at Cornell University, where he directed the Cornell Food and Brand Lab.

Wansink's lab researched people's food choices and ways to improve those choices. Starting in 2017, problems with Wansink's papers and presentations were brought to wider public scrutiny. These problems included conclusions not supported by the data presented, data and figures duplicated across papers, questionable data (including impossible values), incorrect and inappropriate statistical analyses, and "p-hacking". On September 20, 2018, Cornell determined that Wansink had committed scientific misconduct and removed him from research and teaching activities; he resigned effective June 30, 2019.

== Early life and education ==
Brian Wansink was born in Sioux City, Iowa. He was raised in a blue-collar family and is the older brother of Craig Wansink, a professor and chair of the Department of Religious Studies at Virginia Wesleyan. Wansink received a B.S. in business administration from Wayne State College (Nebraska) in 1982, where he was a member of Tau Kappa Epsilon fraternity, and an M.A. in journalism and mass communication from Drake University in 1984, followed by a Ph.D. in marketing (consumer behavior) in 1990 from Stanford Graduate School of Business.

== Career ==
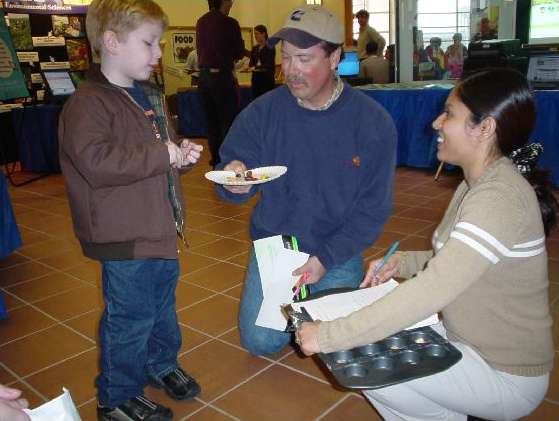
Cornell Food and Brand Lab outreach

=== Professorships ===
Wansink's first academic appointment was to the faculty of the Tuck School of Business at Dartmouth College (1990–1994). He then taught at the Wharton Graduate School of Business at the University of Pennsylvania (1995–1997) and went on to a position as a marketing, nutritional science, advertising, and agricultural economics professor at the University of Illinois at Urbana-Champaign (1997–2005) before moving to the Department of Applied Economics and Management in the College of Agriculture and Life Sciences at Cornell University in 2005. He set up a nonprofit foundation to support his work in 1999.

=== Research ===
Wansink's research focused on ways people make choices, including how portion sizes affect food intake and how convenience and presentation impact food choices. Some of his work led to the introduction of mini-size packaging. Another of his papers found that people who eat with someone who is overweight will make worse food choices, which the UK National Health Service described as "not wholly convincing and does not prove this phenomenon exists in the general population."

In 2005, Wansink's lab published experimental findings in a paper called "Bottomless bowls: why visual cues of portion size may influence intake". In this study, the lab built an apparatus containing a tube that pumped soup into the bottom of a bowl at a steady rate as the participant ate. Those who ate from the bottomless bowl ate more soup than those whose bowls were filled manually, thus making them more aware of the amount they ate. In 2007, Wansink received the Ig Nobel Prize in nutrition for the "bottomless bowls" study. The experiment's data and analysis were challenged as part of the review of Wansink's body of work that started in 2017.

In 2006, Wansink published Mindless Eating: Why We Eat More Than We Think. It was described as a popular science book combined with a self-help diet book, as each chapter ends with brief advice on eating. The book details Wansink's research into what, how much, and when people eat. The book was cited by National Action Against Obesity as being helpful in efforts to curb obesity in the United States and the National Institute of Health's Office of Behavioral and Social Sciences Research produced a "Brian Wansink Spotlight" video regarding this research in March 2016.

In a 2009 paper retracted in 2018, a team led by Wansink described their finding that calorie counts in The Joy of Cooking had gone up around 44% since the cookbook's first edition in 1936, and related this to the obesity epidemic. Over time this finding became a shorthand way to refer to the supposedly unhealthy Western pattern diet. The publisher of Joy of Cooking, John Becker, noticed that Wansink's sample size was small, consisting of only 18 recipes out of about 4500 that were published during the study time interval, and did his own analysis of changes in calories in the recipes. In 2017, after news of Wansink's research practices became widely discussed in the media, Becker sent his results to several statisticians, including James Heathers, a behavioral scientist at Northeastern University. Heathers found Wansink's conclusions to be invalid, and found a number of other problems with Wansink's paper, including counting a whole cake as a "serving" and comparing a recipe for a clear chicken broth with one for gumbo.

Wansink's second book, Slim by Design, was released in 2014. In the same year he ran a Kickstarter campaign and raised around $10,000 to fund a coaching program based on the book; as of February 2018 the program had not been produced.

=== USDA ===
Wansink was appointed as the executive director of the USDA's Center for Nutrition Policy and Promotion from November 2007 through January 2009. He was responsible for oversight of the 2010 Dietary Guidelines for Americans, MyPyramid.gov, and various other food-related programs administered by the USDA.

In 2011, Wansink was elected to a one-year-term as president of the Society for Nutrition Education.

== Retractions and corrections ==
=== Pizza papers ===
In January 2017, the validity of research from Wansink's labs was called into question after Wansink had written a blog post about asking a graduate student to "salvage" conclusions from a study which had null results, subsequently producing five papers from it, all published with Wansink as co-author. Researchers Tim van der Zee, Jordan Anaya, and Nicholas Brown analyzed four of the five papers (referred to as "the pizza papers"), and found conclusions not supported by the data presented, and a total of 150 questionable numbers, such as impossible values, incorrect ANOVA results, and dubious p-values. According to critics, requests for access to the original data were denied by Wansink, who cited privacy issues regarding the anonymity of the participants. A February 2017 article in New York Magazine described the pizza papers as "shockingly unprofessional" and expressed concern over the journals that published them.

In response, Wansink announced an in-depth review of the four disputed papers, after locating some of the original datasets, and published a detailed response in March 2017. A few days later, Cornell released a statement that the university administration had conducted a preliminary investigation of Wansink's four pizza papers, and had not found evidence of scientific misconduct. The investigation did find multiple cases of self-plagiarism and confirmed "numerous instances of inappropriate data handling and statistical analysis", requiring Wansink to hire independent, external statistical experts to check and reanalyze his own review of the papers.

=== Further corrections and retractions ===
Later in 2017, errors were found in six other papers published by members of the Cornell Food and Brand Lab. As of December 2017, six papers had been retracted and 14 corrections had been issued.

By March 2018, two more papers had been retracted and an additional correction made, bringing the total counts to 8 retractions (one paper retracted twice) and 15 corrections. In April 2018, JAMA (Journal of the American Medical Association) issued a "Notice of Expression of Concern" about all six articles authored by Wansink in JAMA and JAMA network specialty journals, to alert the scientific community of concerns about the validity of Wansink's research; the notice included a request for Cornell to have the validity of the papers independently assessed. In September 2018 JAMA retracted six papers by Wansink.

Seventeen other papers authored or co-authored by Wansink were retracted.

=== Cornell's investigation ===
In September 2018, Cornell determined that Wansink had committed scientific misconduct and removed him from all teaching and research positions; he was only allowed to help in investigations of his published work. He also resigned from the university, effective June 30, 2019. After the announcement of his misconduct and resignation, Wansink acknowledged in emails to Buzzfeed that there had been some problems with his publications but also wrote, "There was no fraud, no intentional misreporting, no plagiarism, or no misappropriation." Cornell released a summary of its investigation, in which it stated, "The practices identified included data falsification, a failure to assure data accuracy and integrity, inappropriate attribution of authorship of research publications, inappropriate research methods, failure to obtain necessary research approvals, and dual publication or submission of research findings."

== Books ==
- Sudman, Seymour; Wansink, Brian (2002). Consumer Panels (2nd ed.). Chicago, Ill.: American Marketing Association. ISBN 978-0-87757-297-8.
- Bradburn, Norman M.; Sudman, Seymour; Wansink, Brian (2004). Asking Questions: The Definitive Guide to Questionnaire Design for Market Research, Political Polls, and Social and Health Questionnaires (Rev. ed.). San Francisco: Jossey-Bass. ISBN 978-0-7879-7088-8.
- Wansink, Brian (2004). Marketing Nutrition: Soy, Functional Foods, Biotechnology, and Obesity (First Illinois paperback ed.). Urbana, Ill.: University of Illinois Press. ISBN 978-0-252-02942-4.
- Wansink, Brian (2006). Mindless Eating: Why We Eat More Than We Think. New York: Bantam Books. ISBN 978-0-553-80434-8.
- Wansink, Brian (2014). Slim by Design: Mindless Eating Solutions for Everyday Life. New York: HarperCollins Publishers. ISBN 978-0062136527.

== Personal ==
Wansink is married and has three daughters. His wife trained as a chef at Le Cordon Bleu.

== See also ==
- List of Ig Nobel Prize winners
- List of scientific misconduct incidents
