= Hentges =

Hentges is a surname. Notable people with the surname include:

- Eric Hentges (born 1952), American executive director of the International Life Sciences Institute
- François Hentges (1885–1968), Luxembourgish gymnast
- Hale Hentges (born 1996), American football tight end
- Pierre Hentges (1890–1975), Luxembourgish gymnast
- Roby Hentges (born 1940), Luxembourgish cyclist
- Sam Hentges (baseball) (born 1996), American baseball pitcher
- Sam Hentges (ice hockey) (born 1999), American ice hockey player
