= Obesity in the United States =

Share of females defined as obese

Share of adults that are obese, 1975 to 2016

Obesity is common in the United States and is a major health issue linked to certain cancers, coronary artery disease, type 2 diabetes, stroke, and cardiovascular disease, as well as early mortality and economic costs. Obesity has long been a common stereotype associated with Americans. In 2009 the United States was described as undergoing an "obesity epidemic" with 35% of the population classified as obese. In more recent years, the adult obesity rate fell by about 2% between 2020 and 2023.

== Definition of obesity ==
Obesity is defined as having excess body fat. The most common method of measurement is the Body Mass Index (BMI), which is calculated using a person's height and weight.

== Statistics ==
Prevalence of obesity in the adult population, top countries (2016), the United States had the tenth highest rate in the world.

The CDC defines an adult (a person aged 20 years or greater) with a body mass index (BMI) of 30 or greater as obese and an adult with a BMI of 25.0 to 29.9 as overweight. Obesity in adults is divided into three categories. Adults with a BMI of 30 to 34.9 have class 1 obesity; adults with a BMI of 35 to 39.9 have class 2 obesity; adults with a BMI of 40 or greater have class 3 obesity, also known as extreme or severe obesity (and formerly morbid obesity). Children (persons aged 2 to 19 years) with a BMI at or above the 95th percentile of children of the same age and sex are defined as obese, and children with a BMI at or above the 85th percentile but less than the 95th percentile are defined as overweight.

Compared to non-obese Americans, between 2001 and 2016, obese Americans incurred an average of $2,505 more in medical expenses annually, and in 2016, the aggregate medical cost due to obesity in the United States of America was $260.6 billion. However, some evidence suggests the lifetime cost of medical treatment for obese individuals is lower than for healthy weight individuals. This is because healthy-weight people live longer statistically and tend to develop chronic diseases that need to be continually treated into old age, whereas obese people tend to die from metabolic diseases at younger ages and avoid some of those protracted medical costs. While lifetime medical costs for obese individuals may be lower than for healthy weight individuals, obese individuals cause significant economic productivity loss (ranging from $13.4 billion to $26.8 billion in 2016).

The obesity rate steadily increased from around 1960–1962, when approximately 13% of American adults were obese. By 2014, figures from the CDC found that more than one-third (crude estimate 36.5%) of U.S. adults and 17% of children were obese. By 2014, figures from the National Institute of Diabetes showed that 82% of Americans were overweight. National Center for Health Statistics at the CDC showed that 42.4% of U.S. adults were obese as of 2017–2018 (43% for men and 41.9% for women). The National Institute of Diabetes states that 73.1% of Americans were obese or overweight as of 2017-2018.

For the following statistics, "adult" is defined as age 20 and over. The combined overweight and obese percentages for the overall US population reached 39.4% in 1997, 44.5% in 2004, 56.6% in 2007, 63.8% (adults) and 17% (children) in 2008, and in 2010, 65.7% of American adults and 17% of American children were overweight or obese, and 63% of teenage girls became overweight by age 11. In 2013, the Organization for Economic Co-operation and Development (OECD) found that 57.6% of all American citizens were overweight or obese. The organization in 2013 estimated that 3/4 of the American population would be overweight or obese by 2020. In 2019 Harvard T.H. Chan School of Public Health estimated that around 40% of Americans were considered obese, and 18% were considered severely obese. The study defined severe obesity as a BMI over 35. Their projections said that about half of the US population (48.9%) would be considered obese and nearly 1 in 4 (24.2%) would be considered severely obese by 2030.

Newer data from 2024 showed that the U.S. adult obesity rate fell by about 2% from 2020 to 2023, according to the U.S. National Health and Nutrition Examination Survey. Researchers attribute this decline in part to the increasing use of weight loss drugs like Wegovy and Ozempic, now used by 6% of Americans. These medications may be helping to reverse the long-standing rise in obesity rates in the country.

=== Global obesity compared to the United States ===
Obesity Rates by Country 2023

A survey in 2007 showed 63% of Americans were overweight or obese, with 26% in the obese category (a BMI of 30 or more). "By 2014, 37.7% of adults in the United States were obese, 35% of men and 40.4% of women (BMI over 40) values were 7.7% for men and 9.9% for women." However, according to world statistics, "American Samoans have the highest BMI (75.6) while Egypt has 43% and Iraq has a BMI of 37.4%." According to the WHO (World Health Organization), obesity has tripled since 1975 and research has shown that obesity is linked to health issues, and the high cost of medical care. The Pacific Islands dominate the top obese countries and factors contributing to this problem include dietary changes, fast foods, and possible genetic predispositions. The least obese countries include Madagascar, Ethiopia, and Japan. Factors involve a more healthy diet, famine and poverty. WHO and GOO research reports that obesity rates vary by country because of lifestyle, diet and also obesity rates depend on economic status as well. However, the wealthier the country is, the more educated their citizens tend to be. Promoting a healthier lifestyle is encouraged. The United States, being one of the wealthiest countries, has the 18th highest obesity rate in the world at 42.7%; researchers attribute that to diet, environment and cultural factors.

== Epidemiology ==
Obesity is a chronic health problem. It is one of the biggest factors for type II diabetes and cardiovascular disease. It is also associated with cancer (e.g., colorectal cancer), osteoarthritis, liver disease, sleep apnea, depression, and other medical conditions that affect mortality and morbidity.

According to NHANES data, African American and Mexican American adolescents between 12 and 19 years old are more likely to be overweight than non-Hispanic White adolescents. The prevalence is 21%, 23% and 14% respectively. Also, in a national survey of American Indian children 5–18 years old, 39 percent were found to be overweight or at risk for being overweight. As per national survey data, these trends indicate that by 2030, 86.3% of adults will be overweight or obese and 51.1% obese.

A 2007 study found that long-term participation in the Supplemental Nutrition Assistance Program was associated with a 50% increased obesity rate among female adults.

Looking at the long-term consequences, overweight adolescents have a 70 percent chance of becoming overweight or obese adults, which increases to 80 percent if one or both parents are overweight or obese. In 2000, the total cost of obesity for children and adults in the United States was estimated to be US$117 billion (US$61 billion in direct medical costs). Given existing trends, this amount is projected to range from US$860.7–956.9 billion in healthcare costs by 2030.

Food consumption has increased over time. Annual per capita consumption of cheese was 4 pounds (1.8 kg) in 1909; 32 pounds (15 kg) in 2000; the average person consumed 389 grams (13.7 oz) of carbohydrates daily in 1970; 490 grams (17 oz) in 2000; 41 pounds (19 kg) of fats and oils in 1909; 79 pounds (36 kg) in 2000. In 1977, 18% of an average person's food was consumed outside the home; in 1996, this had risen to 32%.

Obesity is a major public health problem in the United States owing to its rapidly increasing prevalence, substantial mortality and morbidity, and growing healthcare costs. Several studies have inquired about the relationship between the community food environment and obesity, which is often inversely related. The large-scale study demonstrated a substantial and inverse relationship between the local food environment and adult obesity in the US using local spatially weighted regression. Approximately 23.5 million Americans live in food deserts, areas in geolocations with minimal healthy food retailers. More importantly, the study found considerable regional differences in the strength and direction of this connection. The findings of the study also show the need for geographically specific public health policies and interventions to address issues with food environments that are specific to particular regions.

== Contributing factors ==
Obesity rates of adult females, 1960–2015

Numerous studies have attempted to identify contributing factors for obesity in the United States. Common factors include an overconsumption of food and an insufficient amount of physical exercise. Only 20% of jobs require physical activity.

Related factors that have been attributed to an increase in childhood obesity include "food deserts." Food deserts are considered urban areas that do not have the stores or access to proper nutritional food required for a sustainably healthy diet. Certain examples of this would include cities where transportation may be limited, and the only surrounding food available at an affordable price is limited to fast food. Food insecure individuals have turned to food banks, which in turn has led to a rise in obesity and diabetes within the food insecure community. Individuals in lower income areas are dependent on food banks and because of that are not getting foods that are high in nutrients. Food insecure individuals, who live in low-income communities experience higher rates of chronic disease, leading to healthcare costs which create more financial hardships.

Obesity rates of adult males, 1960–2015

Other factors not directly related to caloric intake and activity levels that are believed to contribute to obesity include air conditioning, the ability to delay gratification, and the alterations in the prefrontal cortex of the brain. Genetics are also believed to be a factor, with a 2018 study stating that the presence of the human gene APOA2 could result in a higher BMI in individuals. Additionally, factors contributing to the probability of obesity can occur even before birth, including maternal behaviors during gestation such as smoking or significant weight gain.

The microbiome (population of microbes like bacteria, fungi, and viruses) of a person's gastrointestinal tract can additionally contribute to obesity and is also modified by it. Lean people and obese people have been shown to have differences in their gut bacteria which affect their metabolism.

Body positivity and Fat acceptance are movements that promote a positive view of all body sizes, including morbid obesity and aim to curb social stigma regarding obesity. The movement has been the subject of significant criticism for ignoring objective scientific studies and putting participants' life at risk.

== Causes of obesity ==
=== Dietary ===
In the United States, many people's diets are excessively high in calories, often due to fast food and sugary beverages. Individuals with obesity may consume more calories before feeling full, experience hunger more quickly, or eat in response to stress or anxiety. Per the USDA's Dietary Guidelines for Americans, 2020-2025, most Americans do not follow a healthy dietary pattern. Few individuals being tested for nutrient levels would be able to meet them without the use of fortification or enrichment. Americans eat an abundance of fast food. 36.6% of adults consume fast food on a given day and 2 out of 3 people consume fast food at least once a week. While the negative effects of fast food, such as lack of nutritional value and high amounts of calories, are widely known, fast food remains popular for its convenience, specifically because it is time-efficient and cheap.

The quantity of food consumption plays an important role as well. A study shows a significant increase in food portion sizes of marketplace products since the 1970s that exceed the federal standards for dietary guidance. Reasons for this increase include the expansion of the food industry since the seventies, marketing strategies, and customer demand. Extreme differences in portion sizes between the same menu items of the same franchises have also been observed. In some instances, American food portions are as much as double their British counterparts.

=== Physical activity and transportation ===
"In 2020, 24.2% of adults aged 18 and over met the 2018 Physical Activity Guidelines for Americans for both aerobic and muscle-strengthening activities." This means that more than 75% of citizens did not get enough physical activity that is necessary for their well-being. With the increase in the usage of automobiles in the 20th century, physical activity has become less necessary. As of 2024, 91.7% of households in the US have at least one vehicle. A researcher from the University of Illinois, Sheldon Jacobson, discusses the surge of passenger vehicle usage in relation to the surge of obesity rates between the 1950s and today: "For the last 60-plus years, we've literally built our society around the automobile and getting from point A to point B as quickly as we can. Because we choose to drive rather than walk or cycle, the result is an inactive, sedentary lifestyle. Not coincidentally, obesity also became a public health issue during this period." Since obesity is affected by not only energy intake but also by energy output, the shift to driving has resulted in less physical activity and a higher risk of obesity.

=== Genetics ===
The amount of body fat a person retains, and the speed with which his or her body converts food into energy are all influenced by genetics. But the extent of genetics' overall influence has been debated. The involvement of the central nervous system in body weight management is supported by recent advances in obesity genetics. This happens through the control of long-term energy use and other systems (such as the food reward mechanism), demonstrating that the cause of obesity cannot be limited only to peripherally mediated pathways. The environment, the five senses, stress, emotions, reward, sleep, eating disorders, and information gaps all have an impact on how we eat. McGill University conducted a study on how obesity is genetically intertwined with brain structure and mental performance. Through their research, we believe that there is a link between obesity, the brain, and genetics.

== Effects on life expectancy ==
The United States' high obesity rate is a major contributor to its relatively lower life expectancy in comparison with other high-income countries. In the US, about 20% of cancer deaths in women and 14% of those in men are due to obesity. It has been suggested that obesity may lead to a halt in the rise in life expectancy observed in the United States during the 19th and 20th centuries. In the event that obesity continues to grow in newer generations, a decrease in well-being and lifespan in future generations may continue to worsen. According to Olshansky, obesity diminishes "the length of life of people who are severely obese by an estimated 5 to 20 years." History shows that the number of years lost will continue to grow because the likelihood of obesity in new generations is higher. Children and teens are now experiencing obesity at younger ages. They are eating less healthy and are becoming less active, possibly resulting in less time lived compared to their parents'. The life expectancy for newer generations can be lower due to obesity and the health risks they can experience at a later age.

There has been an increase in obesity-related medical problems, including type II diabetes, hypertension, cardiovascular disease, and disability. In particular, diabetes has become the seventh leading cause of death in the United States, with the U.S. Department of Health and Human Services estimating in 2008 that fifty-seven million adults aged twenty and older were pre-diabetic, 23.6 million diabetic, with 90–95% of the latter being type 2-diabetic.

Obesity has also been shown to increase the prevalence of complications during pregnancy and childbirth. Babies born to obese women are almost three times as likely to die within one month of birth and almost twice as likely to be stillborn than babies born to women of normal weight.

== Prevalence ==
The National Center for Health Statistics (NCHS) estimated that, for 2015–2016 in the U.S., 39.8% of adults aged 20 and over were obese (including 7.6% with severe obesity) and that another 31.8% were overweight. They reported in November 2015:

Trends in obesity prevalence show no increase among youth since 2003–2004, but trends do show increases in both adults and youth from 1999 to 2000 through 2013–2014. No significant differences between 2011 and 2012 and 2013–2014 were seen in either youth or adults.

In the NCHS update for 2018, statistics on severe obesity among U.S. adults had already climbed to 9.2% while the total obesity prevalence had reached 42.4%. This also marked the first time in American history that the obesity rates had reached or exceeded 2/5 people in every adult age group.

Obesity rates have increased for all population groups in the United States over the last several decades. Between 1986 and 2000, the prevalence of severe obesity (BMI ≥ 40 kg/m^{2}) quadrupled from one in two hundred Americans to one in fifty. Extreme obesity (BMI ≥ 50 kg/m^{2}) in adults increased by a factor of five, from one in two thousand to one in four hundred.

Previous studies often show that lower income is associated with higher risk of obesity. The CDC once again provides the statistics, concluding that, "During 2011–2014, the age-adjusted prevalence of obesity among adults was lower in the highest income group (31.2%) than the other groups (40.8% [>130% to ≤350%] and 39.0% [≤130%])."

There have been similar increases seen in children and adolescents, with the prevalence of overweight in pediatric age groups nearly tripling over the same period. Approximately nine million children over six years of age are considered obese. Several recent studies have shown that the rise in obesity in the US is slowing, possibly explained by saturation of health-oriented media.

=== Race ===
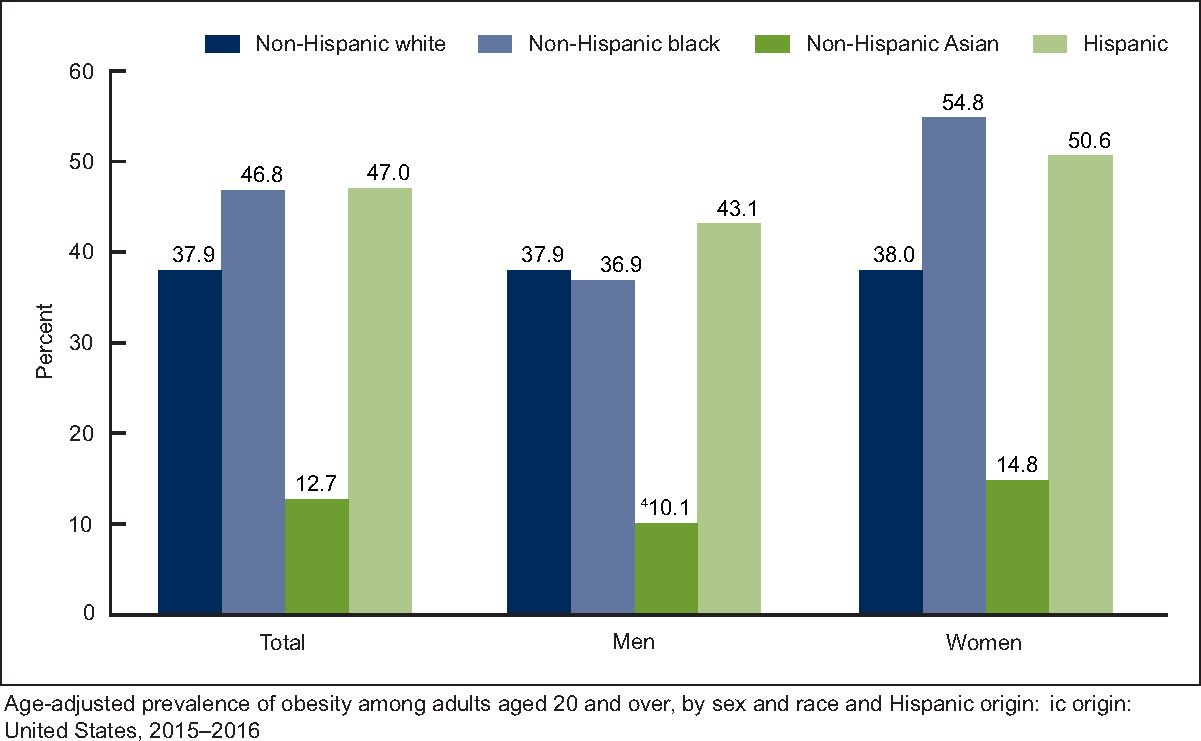
Rates of obesity in US by race based on 2015–2016 data

Obesity is distributed unevenly across racial groups in the United States.

Many racial minority populations disproportionately reside in low-income neighborhoods that can lack resources such as adequate healthcare, safe recreational areas, and grocery stores offering affordable, nutritious food options such as fresh fruits and vegetables. Furthermore, minority households can be more prone to obesity because of cultural food preferences and family norms. The higher prevalence of obesity among Black women compared to other demographics has been attributed to influence from cultural beauty ideals that tolerate or favor fuller body shapes.

Hispanics have a high genetic susceptibility to obesity, as their Native American ancestors had adapted to a low-calorie diet, which predisposes Hispanics to obesity in the modern world, where high-calorie foods are abundant.

==== White Americans ====
As of 2018, 41.3% of white American men over the age of 20 are obese, while 39% of white women in this age cohort are obese. However, newer data from 2025 suggests that the actual obesity rate for White Americans is around 65%, based on anthropometric measurements alone rather than BMI. This newer study did not segregate Hispanics as a race and includes people identifying as both "White" and "Hispanic".

==== Black or African American ====
As of 2023, the obesity rate for Black adults age 20 years and older was 42.9%.

For adult Black men in 2018, the rate of obesity was 31.2%. For adult Black women, the rate of obesity was 44.3%.

==== American Indian or Alaska Native ====
The obesity rate for American Indian or Alaska Native adults (BMI over 30) in the US in 2015 was 42.9%. However, newer research based on waist circumference suggests that the actual rate of obesity among Native Americans is approximately 80%.

==== Asian ====
42.7% of Asian Americans were obese or overweight from 2013-2016.

Asian Americans are less likely to be obese than other ethnic groups in the United States; however, their obesity rates are also rising faster.

However, this older data for Asian Americans relies only on the BMI concept. A newer study published in 2025 suggested that the diagnosis of obesity should include direct measurements of the waistline, as well as waist-to-height ratio, to get a truly accurate diagnosis of obesity. Under this new definition of obesity, 51% of Asian Americans are obese, which represents a 90.3% increase compared to the older, less holistic statistics.

The 2025 study also found that Asian Americans had a distinct metabolic profile that put them at increased risk of obesity-related health problems compared to other groups.

Even before this study was published, previous studies had suggested that the obesity rate among Asian Americans may be underestimated, because it relies on the controversial BMI concept. However, Asians have a higher percentage of body fat than white Americans, and a lower percentage of muscle mass, a condition Melissa Dahl refers to as "skinny fat". Evidence shows that Asians develop diabetes and cardiovascular diseases at a lower BMI than white Americans, which suggests that BMI may not be an accurate indicator of obesity in Asian Americans, and that it is also a poor predictor of Asian American health.

Rates of obesity among Asian Americans varied widely by ethnicity, with Filipinos and South Asians having the highest rates of obesity in the Asian American population.

==== Hispanic or Latino ====
As of 2018, 80% of Hispanic women (age 20 and over) are overweight or obese, compared to 66% of non-Hispanic white women.

The obesity rate for Hispanic women is 47.1%, while for men, the rate is 44.3%. Hispanic men are 10% more likely to be obese than non-Hispanic white men.

==== Native Hawaiian or other Pacific Islander ====
The obesity rate for Native Hawaiian or other Pacific Islander adults (BMI over 30) in the US in 2015 was 33.4%. No breakdown by sex was given for Native Hawaiian or other Pacific Islander adults in the CDC figures.

=== Sex ===
Over 70 million adults in the U.S. are obese (35 million men and 35 million women). 99 million are overweight (45 million women and 54 million men). NHANES 2016 statistics showed that about 39.6% of American adults were obese. Men had an age-adjusted rate of 37.9% and Women had an age-adjusted rate of 41.1%.

The CDC provided a data update in May 2017 stating that for adults 20 years and older, the crude obesity rate was 39.8% and the age-adjusted rate was measured to be 39.7%. Including the obese, 71.6% of all American adults age 20 and above were overweight.

=== Age ===
Historically, obesity primarily affected adults, but childhood obesity has grown significantly in recent decades. From the mid-1980s to the mid-2010s, obesity roughly doubled among U.S. children ages 2 to 5 and roughly tripled among young people over the age of 6. Overall, obesity in the United States peaks during the middle-aged years. During the period 2015–16, the prevalence of obesity among adults aged 20–39 was 35.7%, among those aged 40–59, 42.8%, and among those 60 and over, 41.0%.

==== Children and teens ====
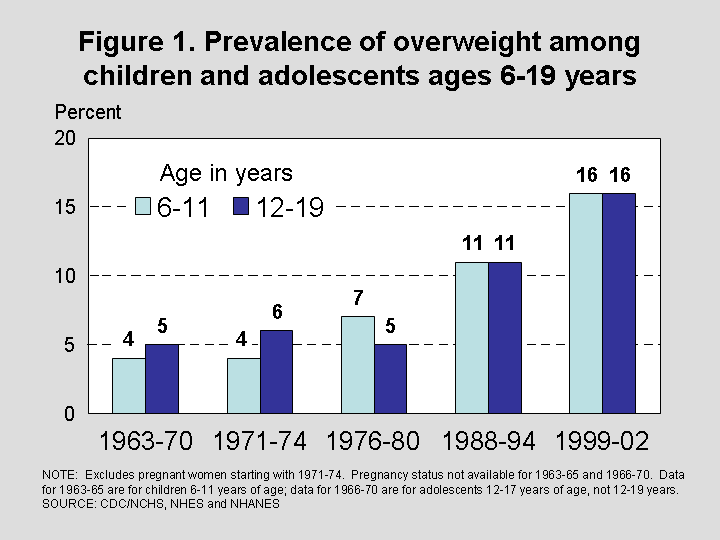
The rise of overweight among children aged 6–19 in the US

From 1980 to 2008, the prevalence of obesity in children aged 6 to 11 years tripled from 6.5% to 19.6%. The prevalence of obesity in teenagers more than tripled from 5% to 18.1% in the same time frame. In less than one generation, the average weight of a child has risen by 5 kg in the United States. The CDC has reported that, in 2014, 17.2% of youth aged 2–19 were considered obese and another 16.2% were overweight. Meaning, over one-third of children and teens in the US were overweight or obese. Statistics from a 2016–2017 page on the CDC's official website show that 13.9% of toddlers and children age 2–5, 18.4% of children 6–11, and 20.6% of adolescents 12–19 are obese. The prevalence of child obesity in today's society concerns health professionals because a number of these children develop health issues that weren't usually seen until adulthood.

Some of the consequences of childhood and adolescent obesity are psychosocial. Overweight children and overweight adolescents are targeted for social discrimination, and thus, they begin to stress-eat. The psychological stress that a child or adolescent can endure from social stigma can cause low self-esteem, which can hinder a child's after school social and athletic capability, especially in plump teenage girls, and could continue into adulthood.

Data from NHANES surveys (1976–1980 and 2003–2006) show that the prevalence of obesity has increased: for children aged 2–5 years, prevalence increased from 5.0% to 12.4%; for those aged 6–11 years, prevalence increased from 6.5% to 19.6%; and for those aged 12–19 years, prevalence increased from 5.0% to 17.6%.

In 2000, approximately 39% of children (ages 6–11) and 17% of adolescents (ages 12–19) were overweight and an additional 15% of children and adolescents were at risk of becoming overweight, based on their BMI.

Analyses of the trends in high BMI for age showed no statistically significant trend over the four time periods (1999–2000, 2001–2002, 2003–2004, and 2005–2006) for either boys or girls. Overall, in 2003–2006, 11.3% of children and adolescents aged 2 through 19 years were at or above the 97th percentile of the 2000 BMI-for-age growth charts, 16.3% were at or above the 95th percentile, and 31.9% were at or above the 85th percentile.

Trend analyses indicate no significant trend between 1999 and 2000 and 2007–2008 except at the highest BMI cut point (BMI for age 97th percentile) among all 6- through 19-year-old boys. In 2007–2008, 9.5% of infants and toddlers were at or above the 95th percentile of the weight-for-recumbent-length growth charts. Among children and adolescents aged 2 through 19 years, 11.9% were at or above the 97th percentile of the BMI-for-age growth charts; 16.9% were at or above the 95th percentile; and 31.7% were at or above the 85th percentile of BMI for age.

In summary, between 2003 and 2006, 11.3% of children and adolescents were obese and 16.3% were overweight. A slight increase was observed in 2007 and 2008, when the recorded data show that 11.9% of the children between 6 and 19 years old were obese and 16.9% were overweight. The data recorded in the first survey was obtained by measuring 8,165 children over four years and the second was obtained by measuring 3,281 children.

"More than 80 percent of affected children become overweight adults, often with lifelong health problems." Children are not only at high risk of diabetes, high cholesterol and high blood pressure but obesity also takes a toll on the child's psychological development. Social problems can arise and have a snowball effect, causing low self-esteem which can later develop into eating disorders.

==== Adults ====
There are more obese US adults than those who are just overweight. According to a study in The Journal of the American Medical Association (JAMA), in 2008, the obesity rate among adult Americans was estimated at 32.2% for men and 35.5% for women; these rates were roughly confirmed by the CDC again for 2009–2010. A Gallup survey found that 41% of U.S. adults, on average, from 2017 to 2021, have characterized themselves as overweight, while the slight majority (53%) have said their weight is about right, and 5% reported they are underweight. Though the rate for women has held steady over the previous decade, the obesity rate for men continued to increase between 1999 and 2008, according to the JAMA study notes. Moreover, "The prevalence of obesity for adults aged 20 to 74 years increased by 7.9 percentage points for men and by 8.9 percentage points for women between 1976–1980 and 1988–1994, and subsequently by 7.1 percentage points for men and by 8.1 percentage points for women between 1988–1994 and 1999–2000." According to the CDC, obesity has consistently remained the highest among middle-aged adults since 2011. In the most recent update, 44.8% of Americans in their forties and fifties qualified as obese; meanwhile 40% of young adults and 42.4% of older adults were obese.

==== Elderly ====
Although obesity is reported in the elderly, the numbers are still significantly lower than the levels seen in the young adult population. It is speculated that socioeconomic factors may play a role in this age group when it comes to developing obesity. Obesity in the elderly increases healthcare costs. Nursing homes are not equipped with the proper equipment needed to maintain a safe environment for the obese residents. If a heavy bedridden patient is not turned, the chances of a bed sore increase. If the sore is untreated, the patient will need to be hospitalized and have a wound vac placed.

=== Prevalence by state and territory ===
Adult obesity rates in the U.S. by state (2013) 20.2–24.0% 24.0–25.0% 25.0–26.8% 26.8–28.7% 28.7–30.4% 30.4–32.7% 32.7–34.0% 34.0–35.2%

Obesity rates in the U.S. by state (1985–2010)

The following figures were averaged from 2005 to 2007 adult data compiled by the CDC BRFSS program and 2003–2004 child data^{[A]} from the National Survey of Children's Health. There is also data from a more recent 2016 CDC study of the 50 states plus the District of Columbia, Puerto Rico, the U.S. Virgin Islands and Guam.

Care should be taken in interpreting these numbers, because they are based on self-report surveys which asked individuals (or, in the case of children and adolescents, their parents) to report their height and weight. Height is commonly overreported and weight underreported, sometimes resulting in significantly lower estimates. One study estimated the difference between actual and self-reported obesity as 7% among males and 13% among females as of 2002, with the tendency to increase.

The long-running REGARDS study, published in the journal of Obesity in 2014, brought in individuals from the nine census regions and measured their height and weight. The data collected disagreed with the data in the CDC's phone survey used to create the following chart. REGARDS found that the West North Central region (North Dakota, South Dakota, Minnesota, Missouri, Nebraska, and Iowa) and the East North Central region (Illinois, Ohio, Wisconsin, Michigan, and Indiana) were the worst in obesity numbers, not the East South Central region (Tennessee, Mississippi, Alabama, Kentucky) as had been previously thought. Dr. P.H., professor in the Department of Biostatistics in the UAB School of Public Health George Howard explains that "Asking someone how much they weigh is probably the second worst question behind how much money they make," "From past research, we know that women tend to under-report their weight, and men tend to over-report their height." Howard said that, as far as equivalency between the self-reported and measured data sets, the East South Central region showed the least misreporting. "This suggests that people from the South come closer to telling the truth than people from other regions, perhaps because there's not the social stigma of being obese in the South as there is in other regions."

The area of the United States with the highest obesity rate is American Samoa (75% obese and 95% overweight).

States, district, & territories	Obesity rank	Obese adults		Overweight (incl. obese) adults (mid-2000s)	Obese children and adolescents (mid-2000s)
States, district, & territories	Obesity rank	(mid-2000s)	(2020)	Overweight (incl. obese) adults (mid-2000s)	Obese children and adolescents (mid-2000s)
Alabama	5	30.1%	36.3%	65.4%	16.7%
Alaska	9	27.3%	34.2%	64.5%	11.1%
American Samoa	—	—	75%	95%	35%
Arizona	30	23.3%	29.5%	59.5%	12.2%
Arkansas	7	28.1%	35.0%	64.7%	16.4%
California	48	23.1%	25.1%	59.4%	13.2%
Colorado	51	21.0%	22.6%	55.0%	9.9%
Connecticut	42	20.8%	26.9%	58.7%	12.3%
Delaware	23	25.9%	31.8%	63.9%	22.8%
District of Columbia	50	22.1%	23.0%	55.0%	14.8%
Florida	35	23.3%	28.4%	60.8%	14.4%
(Georgia (U.S. state)) Georgia	24	27.5%	31.6%	63.3%	16.4%
Guam	—	—	28.3%	—	22%
Hawaii	49	20.7%	23.8%	55.3%	13.3%
Idaho	32	24.6%	29.3%	61.4%	10.1%
Illinois	27	25.3%	31.1%	61.8%	15.8%
Indiana	12	27.5%	33.6%	62.8%	15.6%
Iowa	4	26.3%	36.4%	63.4%	12.5%
Kansas	18	25.8%	32.4%	62.3%	14.0%
Kentucky	8	28.4%	34.3%	66.8%	20.6%
Louisiana	6	29.5%	36.2%	64.2%	17.2%
Maine	33	23.7%	29.1%	60.8%	12.7%
Maryland	26	25.2%	31.3%	61.5%	13.3%
Massachusetts	44	20.9%	25.9%	56.8%	13.6%
Michigan	19	27.7%	32.3%	63.9%	14.5%
Minnesota	35	24.8%	28.4%	61.9%	10.1%
Mississippi	2	34.4%	37.3%	67.4%	17.8%
Missouri	17	27.4%	32.5%	63.3%	15.6%
Montana	46	21.7%	25.3%	59.6%	11.1%
Nebraska	15	26.5%	32.8%	63.9%	11.9%
Nevada	43	23.6%	26.7%	61.8%	12.4%
New Hampshire	38	23.6%	28.1%	60.8%	12.9%
New Jersey	41	22.9%	27.3%	60.5%	13.7%
New Mexico	35	23.3%	28.4%	60.3%	16.8%
New York	45	23.5%	25.7%	60.0%	15.3%
North Carolina	20	27.1%	32.1%	63.4%	19.3%
North Dakota	13	25.9%	33.2%	64.5%	12.1%
Northern Mariana Islands	—	—	—	—	16%
Ohio	11	26.9%	33.8%	63.3%	14.2%
Oklahoma	3	28.1%	36.5%	64.2%	15.4%
Oregon	31	25.0%	29.4%	60.8%	14.1%
Pennsylvania	24	25.7%	31.6%	61.9%	13.3%
Puerto Rico	—	—	30.7%	—	26%
Rhode Island	29	21.4%	30.0%	60.4%	11.9%
South Carolina	10	29.2%	34.1%	65.1%	18.9%
South Dakota	22	26.1%	31.9%	64.2%	12.1%
Tennessee	15	29.0%	32.8%	65.0%	20.0%
Texas	14	27.2%	33.0%	64.1%	19.1%
Utah	46	21.8%	25.3%	56.4%	8.5%
Vermont	40	21.1%	27.6%	56.9%	11.3%
(United States Virgin Islands) Virgin Islands (U.S.)	—	—	32.5%	—	—
Virginia	28	25.2%	30.1%	61.6%	13.8%
Washington	39	24.5%	27.7%	60.7%	10.8%
West Virginia	1	30.6%	38.1%	66.8%	20.9%
Wisconsin	21	25.5%	32.0%	62.4%	13.5%
Wyoming	34	24.0%	28.8%	61.7%	8.7%

Except territories, whose data is from the late 2000s to 2010s

== Total costs to the US ==
Obesity has been cited as a contributing factor to approximately 100,000–400,000 deaths in the United States per year (including increased morbidity in car accidents) and has increased health care use and expenditures, costing society an estimated $117 billion in direct (preventive, diagnostic, and treatment services related to weight) and indirect (absenteeism, loss of future earnings due to premature death) costs. This exceeds health-care costs associated with smoking or problem drinking and, by one estimate, accounts for 6% to 12% of national health care expenditures in the United States (although another estimate states the figure is between 5% and 10%).

The Medicare and Medicaid programs bear about half of this cost. Annual hospital costs for treating obesity-related diseases in children rose threefold, from US$35 million to US$127 million, in the period from 1979 to 1999, and the inpatient and ambulatory healthcare costs increased drastically by US$395 per person per year.

These trends in healthcare costs associated with pediatric obesity and its comorbidities are staggering, urging the Surgeon General to predict that preventable morbidity and mortality associated with obesity may surpass those associated with cigarette smoking. Furthermore, the probability of childhood obesity persisting into adulthood is estimated to increase from approximately twenty percent at four years of age to approximately eighty percent by adolescence, and it is likely that these obesity comorbidities will persist into adulthood.

=== In the military ===
An estimated 16% of active-duty U.S. military personnel were obese in 2004, with the cost of remedial bariatric surgery for the military reaching US$15 million in 2002. Obesity is currently the largest single cause for the discharge of uniformed personnel. A financial analysis published in 2007 further showed that the treatment of diseases and disorders associated with obesity costs the military $1.1 billion annually. Moreover, the analysis found that the increased absenteeism of obese or overweight personnel amounted to a further 658,000 work days lost per year. This lost productivity is higher than the productivity loss in the military due to high alcohol consumption, which was found to be 548,000 work days. Problems associated with obesity further manifested themselves in early discharge due to inability to meet weight standards. Approximately 1200 military enlistees were discharged due to this reason in 2006.

The rise in obesity has led to fewer citizens able to join the military and therefore more difficulty in recruitment for the armed forces. In 2005, 9 million adults aged 17 to 24, or 27%, were too overweight to be considered for service in the military. For comparison, just 6% of military-aged men in 1960 would have exceeded the current weight standards of the U.S. military. Excess weight is the most common reason for medical disqualification and accounts for the rejection of 23.3% of all recruits to the military. Of those who failed to meet weight qualifications but still entered the military, 80% left the military before completing their first term of enlistment. In light of these developments, organizations such as Mission: Readiness, made up of retired generals and admirals, have advocated for focusing on childhood health education to combat obesity's effect on the military.

=== Accommodations ===
Along with obesity came the accommodations made for American products. Child-safety seats in 2006 were modified for the 250,000 obese U.S. children ages six and below. The obese incur extra costs for themselves and airlines when flying. Weight is a major component of the formula that goes into the planes' takeoff and for them to successfully fly to the desired destination. Due to the weight limits taken into consideration for flight in 2000, airlines spent $275 million on 350 million additional gallons of fuel for compensation of additional weight to travel. Accommodations have also been made in workplace environments for workers, including those such as chairs with no armrests and access to work outside of the office. Occupational safety may require accommodations such as wider, more robust office chairs that allow for safe and comfortable working.

== Solutions ==
Under pressure from parents and anti-obesity advocates, many school districts banned sodas, junk food, and candy from vending machines and cafeterias. State legislators in California, for example, passed laws banning the sale of machine-dispensed snacks and drinks in elementary schools in 2003, despite objections by the California-Nevada Soft Drink Association. The state followed more recently with legislation to prohibit soda sales in high schools starting July 1, 2009, with the shortfall in school revenue to be compensated by an increase in funding for school lunch programs. A similar law passed by the Connecticut General Assembly in June 2005 was vetoed by Governor Jodi Rell, who stated the legislation "undermines the control and responsibility of parents with school-aged children."

In mid-2006, the American Beverage Association (including Cadbury, Coca-Cola, and PepsiCo) agreed to a voluntary ban on the sale of all high-calorie drinks and all beverages in containers larger than 8, 10 and 12 ounces in elementary, middle and high schools, respectively.

There have been many strategies to try to control obesity issues. One cost-effective population-level change is taxes on sugary drinks. Interventions such as taxes can be a powerful way to improve the economic landscape of the food environment. According to Circulation, "Beverages with added sugar are a prime candidate for taxation; they constitute >10% of caloric intake nationwide and provide little or no nutritional value." Weight gain is due to consumption of these sugary drinks along with other health issues such as diabetes, hypertension, and more.

A penny-per-ounce tax on sugary drinks would raise the shelf price of these drinks by around 20%. Many studies have been done and they have shown that there has been a 14% to 20% reduction in the consumption of these taxed drinks. People's weight will determine if they choose healthier options or not to replace these sugary beverages. This interest of taxes on drinks has been gaining popularity across the U.S. According to Circulation, "They were considered as a measure at the federal level to fund healthcare reform in 2009 and were proposed in 11 states and 2 major cities in the 2009 to 2010 legislative cycle." There has been some resistance from the beverage industry. Policymakers are increasingly considering the beverage industry to promote public health.

Non-profit organizations such as HealthCorps work to educate people on healthy eating and advocate for healthy food choices in an effort to combat obesity.

Former American First Lady Michelle Obama led an initiative to combat childhood obesity entitled "Let's Move!". Obama said she aimed to wipe out obesity "in a generation". Let's Move! has partnered with other programs. Walking and bicycling to school helps children increase their physical activity.

In 2005 MeMe Roth began an obesity campaign that led to several appearances in American mainstream media.

Programs such as Eat Smart, Move More, Weigh Less, developed in 2007 by writing teams from North Carolina State University and North Carolina Division of Public Health, and now available beyond North Carolina, aim to combat obesity by a combination of healthy eating and increased exercise.

In 2008, the state of Pennsylvania enacted a law, the "School Nutrition Policy Initiative," aimed at the elementary level. These "interventions included removing all sodas, sweetened drinks, and unhealthy snack foods from selected schools, 'social marketing' to encourage the consumption of nutritious foods and outreach to parents." The results were a "50 percent drop in incidence of obesity and overweight", as opposed to those individuals who were not part of the study.

In the past decade, there have been school-based programs that target the prevention and management of childhood obesity. There is evidence that long-term school-based programs have been effective in reducing the prevalence of childhood obesity.

For two years, Duke University psychology and global health professor Gary Bennett and eight colleagues followed 365 obese patients who had already developed hypertension. They found that regular medical feedback, self-monitoring, and a set of personalized goals can help obese patients in a primary care setting lose weight and keep it off.

Major U.S. manufacturers of processed food, aware of the possible contribution of their products to the obesity epidemic, met together and discussed the problem as early as April 8, 1999; however, a proactive strategy was considered and rejected. As a general rule, optimizing the amount of salt, sugar and fat in a product will improve its palatability, and profitability. Reducing salt, sugar and fat, for the purpose of public health, had the potential to decrease palatability and profitability.

Media influence may play an important role in the prevention of obesity as it has the ability to boost many of the main prevention/intervention methods used nowadays including lifestyle modification. The media is also highly influential on children and teenagers as it promotes healthy body image and sets societal goals for lifestyle improvement. Examples of media influence are support for the "Let's Move!" campaign and the MyPlate program initiated by Michelle Obama, and the NFL's Play60 campaign. These campaigns promote physical activity in an effort to reduce obesity, especially for children.

In 2011, the Obama administration introduced a $400 million Healthy Food Financing Initiative; the goal of the program is to "create jobs and economic development, and establish market opportunities for farmers and ranchers," as described by the secretary of agriculture, Tom Vilsack.

Population-based approaches have been recommended and pursued in the U.S. Obesity is complex because it affects multiple environments, involves multiple industries and sectors, and affects both energy intake and expenditure. Federal-level policies include the Healthy, Hunger-Free Kids Act, the Supplemental Nutrition Assistance Program Education program, and Safe Routes to School funding. (PMC) The Healthy, Hunger-Free Kids Act of 2010 helped provide nutrition standards for meals and drinks through a variety of programs affecting 50 million children daily at 99,000 schools. The risk of obesity declines each year for children in poverty. The results suggest that the Healthy, Hunger-Free Kids Act's science-based nutritional standards should be maintained to support healthy growth, especially among children living in poverty, according to Health Affairs.

The Supplemental Nutrition Assistance Program Education program (SNAP-Ed) is an approach that helps people be healthy and active. This program teaches people how to manage their SNAP dollars, how to shop and cook for healthy food, and how to stay active. They partner with state and local organizations to meet people where they are located. Some of their efforts include nutrition education classes, policy improvement, social media campaigns, and more. SNAP-Ed directly and sustainably improves food security either with or without food assistance. Nutrition education is critical to improving food security in the U.S. low-income population.

Safe Routes to School is an initiative that makes it safe and convenient for children to walk and bicycle to and from school. The goal is to improve kids' safety, increase their health and physical activity, and get more children walking and bicycling to school. Studies show that Safe Routes to School programs are effective at increasing rates of bicycling and walking to school and decreasing injuries (Safe Routes Partnership).

According to authors from the state of childhood obesity, their focus was on a few programs and policies regarding children. The Child and Adult Food Care Program (CACFP) provides federal funding to many states to reimburse providers for the cost of providing healthy meals to children and adults in their care. Around 4.3 million children and 130,000 adults partake in this program each year. Providers are required to meet the minimum nutrition standards to receive reimbursement. Some of their nutrition requirements are more whole grains, a wider variety of fruits and vegetables, no added sugars, and less saturated fat. The goal is to increase children's intake of these healthy foods, reduce their consumption of grain-based desserts, and improve their overall health. Research has been done on this program and it has been found that participation in CACFP moderately increases the consumption of milk and vegetables among children, and it helps regulate their weight.

Another early childhood education program that helps prepare children for school by providing education, health, and social services is Head Start. This program reaches over one million children who have family economic trouble each year. Early Head Start serves children aged three and under and pregnant women. Head Start and Early Head Start programs participate in either CATFP or the federal school meals programs. Research shows that children who participate in Head Start are more likely to eat better than children who don't participate in this program.

Solutions to worldwide obesity problems require unique approaches that include lifestyle changes, health policies, advancements in healthcare, involvement of parents and concerned citizens and education to prevent this problem from escalating. Several school districts have banned sodas, junk foods and candy from vending machines and cafeterias. Programs have been formed to help improve this health crisis such as, Lets Move, Eat Smart, Move More, Weigh Less, and Weight Watchers are just a few that have helped people lose weight. Some towns have initiatives that are safe routes for children to walk or ride their bikes. This program is called "Safe Routes to School". Educational programs such as Head Start have been created to offer federally funded school meals to children. This was one way of teaching children about healthy choices and good nutrition. Also, to help reduce obesity, the federal and local governments in the United States have asked food and beverage industries to label all foods and drinks. These labels help consumers be more conscious about the foods and drinks they are buying.

Make America Healthy Again is a campaign led by Robert F. Kennedy Jr. during the Second Trump administration. MAHA became a commitment to Donald Trump's 2024 presidential campaign after Robert F. Kennedy Jr. suspended his campaign. Trump established the MAHA Commission on February 13, 2025 to study and recommend policies on the U.S. “childhood chronic disease crisis.” Its main focus is on how diet, environmental chemicals, lack of physical activity, stress, and what it calls “overmedicalization” contribute to rising rates of obesity, diabetes, and other chronic conditions in children.

In November 2025, the Trump administration made an agreement with Novo Nordisk and Eli Lilly to reduce prices on Ozempic (semaglutide) and similar GLP-1 drugs like Wegovy and Zepbound. In February 2026, Trump announced TrumpRx as a discount prescription drug service.

=== Dietary guidelines ===
The USDA 2025–30 Dietary Guidelines for Americans gave the following recommendations:

- eat the right amount for you
- prioritize protein foods at every meal
- incorporate healthy fats
- eat vegetables & fruits throughout the day
- consume dairy
- focus on whole grains
- limit highly processed foods, added sugars, & refined carbohydrates
- limit alcoholic beverages

The guidelines were praised for some recommendations, including emphasizing reducing ultra-processed foods and added sugars in drinks, and encouraging consumption of minimally processed food ("real food"), but widely criticized for a lack of alignment with scientific evidence and a lack of transparency and potential conflicts of interest in developing them. There was widespread criticism of presenting foods rich in saturated fats, increasing protein intake, especially red meat and animal proteins, and inconsistencies include encouraging some foods rich in saturated fats, and downplaying cereals, including whole grains, in favor of animal foods.

=== Food labeling ===
Ultimately, federal and local governments in the U.S. are willing to create political solutions that will reduce obesity rates by "recommending nutrition education, encouraging exercise, and asking the food and beverage industry to promote healthy practices voluntarily." In 2008, New York City was the first city to pass a "labeling bill" that "require[d] restaurants" in several cities and states to "post the caloric content of all regular menu items, in a prominent place and using the same font and format as the price."

Furthermore, adding better labels to food and drink products can help to improve diets. According to a 2021 study, proper labeling on the front side of products has been proven to reduce the amount of unhealthy food purchased. On the other hand, there has been an increase in purchases of healthier products. These labels help consumers to be more health-conscious about the food they are buying.

Many states have started to adopt policies allowing only healthier drinks such as milk and water. In general, the Affordable Care Act started to require chain restaurants to post calorie information on their menus, menu boards, and to provide additional nutrition information such as saturated fat and added sugars to customers upon request. The Food and Drug Administration's rules that enforce this provision took effect in 2018. It has applied to supermarkets, convenience stores, delis, movie theaters, and stadiums. Retailers with fewer than 20 locations don't have to abide by these rules. It has been shown that the benefits of this calorie labeling has increased awareness of and a reduction in calories purchased. It has also been shown to reduce calorie intake and portion sizes. A net savings total of $8 billion over 20 years will be saved by the menu labeling policy, according to an FDA regulatory impact analysis.

== See also ==
- Health in the United States
- EPODE International Network, the world's largest obesity-prevention network
- Fat acceptance movement
- Hunger in the United States
- List of countries by Body Mass Index (BMI)
- Obesogen
- World Fit, a program of the United States Olympic Committee
- Epidemiology of obesity

=== Documentaries ===
- Fed Up
- Super Size Me
- Soul Food Junkies

=== Fictional characters ===
- Television: Fat Albert, Eric Cartman, Peter Griffin, Homer Simpson
- Video games: Fat Princess, Rufus (Street Fighter)
- Other: Blob (Marvel Comics), Butterball Cenobite (comics & films)
