= Center for Nutrition Policy and Promotion =

U.S. federal government research agency

The Center for Nutrition Policy and Promotion (CNPP) is a program area of the USDA's Food and Nutrition Service (FNS), originally created in 1994 and merged into FNS beginning in 2017, to improve the health and well-being of Americans by establishing national dietary guidelines based on the best science available. CNPP promotes dietary guidance by linking scientific research to the nutritional needs of the American public through the function of USDA's Nutrition Evidence Library, which it created and manages.

The Center serves as the administrative agency within the U.S. Department of Agriculture (USDA) for the issuance of the Dietary Guidelines for Americans, which provide evidence-based advice for people 2 years and older about how good dietary habits can promote health and reduce the risk for major chronic diseases. However, as a result of conflicts of interest, the Guidelines sometimes favor the interests of the food and drug industries over the public's interest in accurate and impartial dietary advice.

The 2015-2020 Dietary Guidelines were released on Jan. 7, 2016. The updated Guidelines recommend that Americans consume "a healthy eating pattern at an appropriate calorie level to help achieve and maintain healthy body weight, support nutrient adequacy, and reduce the risk of chronic disease. ... [C]hoose a variety of nutrient-dense foods across and within all food groups in recommended amounts. Limit calories from added sugars and saturated fats and reduce sodium intake. ... [And] Shift to healthier food and beverage choices."

MyPlate is USDA's food icon and replaced MyPyramid and the Food Guide Pyramid as the Government's primary food group symbol.

Former executive directors have been:

#	Executive Directors	Education	Term of Office	President(s) served under
1	Eileen Kennedy	D.Sc.	1994–1997	Bill Clinton
2	Rajen Anand	D.V.M., Ph.D.	1997–2001	Bill Clinton
3	Eric Hentges	Ph.D.	2003–2007	George W. Bush
4	Brian Wansink	Ph.D.	2008–2009	George W. Bush
5	Robert C. Post	Ph.D., MEd., MSc.	January 2009–July 2009 (Acting Executive Director)	Barack Obama
6	Rajen Anand	D.V.M., Ph.D.	November 2009–June 2013	Barack Obama
7	Robert C. Post	Ph.D., MEd., MSc.	July–October 2013	Barack Obama
8	Jackie Haven	MS, RD	October 2013–July 2014	Barack Obama
9	Angie Tagtow	MS, RD, LD	July 2014–February 2017	Barack Obama

== See also ==
- Food preferences in older adults and seniors
- Healthy diet
- History of USDA nutrition guides
- Dietary Guidelines Advisory Committee
