= MeMe Roth =

American anti-obesity activist

Meme Roth
- Born: Meredith Clements
- Education: University of Georgia (B.A., 1991)
- Occupation: Anti-obesity activist

Meredith "Meme" Roth (née Clements) is an anti-obesity activist and founder of the National Action Against Obesity, a campaign that she runs out of her home in Manhattan. Roth has appeared on Fox News, CNN, CNBC, Penn & Teller: Bullshit!, and Dr. Phil to discuss her views on health and obesity.

== Early life and education ==
MeMe Roth was born Meredith Clements. She grew up in Atlanta and graduated from the University of Georgia with a degree in Journalism in 1991.

Roth has a number of obese relatives, including her mother, father, grandmothers, and uncles. Roth recalls a time in kindergarten when she felt embarrassed for her classmates to find out her mother was obese: "I felt ashamed, I was grateful that down the block there was another mother who was fatter than my mother."

== Career ==
Before her campaign against obesity, Roth worked at a number of public relations firms, including Edelman and Ogilvy Public Relations.

Roth started her anti-obesity activism in 2005; she issued a press release over the snacks being distributed at her son's elementary school.

In 2006, Roth termed her mission "the National Action Against Obesity". In 2009, Roth's fight against junk food was featured in The New York Times.

== Platform ==
Roth claims that "this culture refuses to foster healthy children," and has campaigned against American traditions from Girl Scout cookies—claiming a youth organization should not make profit from sweets, to Santa Claus—saying the customary image of Santa Claus is "close to morbidly obese." She has pushed for making permission slips mandatory for any food, including birthday cakes and cupcakes, that is not included on the official school lunch menu. Roth's stated mission is "asking America to make the same decision I made…to shelve all excuses and take it upon myself to maintain a healthy body." Roth has also criticized the weight and diets of a number of celebrities including American Idol Season 6 winner Jordin Sparks, Olympic gold medalist Michael Phelps, and actress Angelina Jolie. She has also suggested that teen clothing lines encourage obesity by producing plus-sized clothing.

In 2006, Roth started a blog that issues the "Wedding Gown Challenge" to married women. She challenges women to maintain their weight by trying on—and trying to fit into—their wedding gowns each year. Roth's platform has been criticized in the media by figures including Rush Limbaugh and the National Association to Advance Fat Acceptance.

== Personal life ==
Roth and her husband have two children and live in Manhattan, New York.
