= Eat Smart, Move More, Weigh Less =

Weight management program

- Purpose: Weight management, healthy eating, physical activity, obesity
- Location: Raleigh, North Carolina
- Method: Educating individuals to plan, track and be mindful about what they eat and their level of physical activity
- Website: esmmweighless.com

Eat Smart, Move More, Weigh Less is a 15-week adult weight management program that uses strategies based on evidence for weight loss and/or weight maintenance. The Eat Smart Move More Weigh Less classes focus on the 12 evidence-based eating and physical activity behaviors for weight management. The program does not provide a prescriptive diet plan, it teaches small lifetime changes. The program teaches mindfulness as a strategy to become more aware of eating and physical activity. Eat Smart, Move More, Weigh Less includes methods for planning and tracking healthy eating and physical activity behaviors. In 2007, Eat Smart, Move More, Weigh Less curriculum was developed by a writing team from North Carolina State University and North Carolina Division of Public Health. A complete listing of authors and their respective affiliations can be found on the program website. The 15-lesson curriculum was peer reviewed by state and local nutrition and physical activity professionals, representatives from the medical community, and a CDC project officer.

== Behavior change theory ==
Eat Smart, Move More, Weigh Less uses the theory of planned behavior as the theoretical framework to motivate participants to make behavior changes related to eating and physical activity.

== Program description ==
The program was developed and written by a diverse group of professionals from public health, research, education, and medicine. These authors have expertise in physical activity, nutrition, and weight loss. The lessons focus on 12 evidence-based healthy eating and physical activity behaviors for weight management. Published data were used to identify key weight loss and weight maintenance strategies. These include eating fewer calories; eating more fruits and vegetables; eating more whole grains; eating breakfast regularly; controlling/decreasing portion sizes; eating more meals at home; drinking fewer calorie-containing beverages; keeping a food/physical activity record; increasing physical activity; and watching less television. In addition, methods for planning and tracking lifestyle behaviors along with mindful eating concepts are included in each lesson. Mindfulness and tracking behaviors have both been shown in the professional literature to be associated with better weight loss success. The curriculum uses the theory of planned behavior to motivate participants to make behavior change.

== Collaborators ==
Eat Smart, Move More, Weigh Less is conducted in collaboration with NC Cooperative Extension, NC State University and the Physical Activity and Nutrition Branch, NC Division of Public Health. Other collaborating organizations include East Carolina University Brody School of Medicine and the State Health Plan in North Carolina for Teachers and State Employees.

== Scope ==
- Statewide Program - Local infrastructure of Cooperative Extension Agents and Health Promotion Coordinators offer the program as onsite classes within North Carolina in their local communities.
- Plan-Funded Program - Grant funding from the State Health Plan in North Carolina for Teachers and State Employees (Plan) provides for onsite classes in five North Carolina counties (Wake, Guilford, Orange, Pitt, and Mecklenburg) for Plan members. Plan members in all North Carolina counties also have the option to participate in online classes.
- Eat Smart, Move More, Weigh Less Online Program - Online classes available within and outside of North Carolina using synchronous distance education technology.
- As at the time of editing (March 2024) there are several online references to ESMMWL programs beyond North Carolina, suggesting its use has spread widely.

== Research ==
Research has been conducted on participant outcomes for Eat Smart, Move More, Weigh Less. Participants who completed the statewide program (n=1,162) (offered by Cooperative Extension Agents and Health Promotion Coordinators) between January 2008 and May 2009 had an average weight loss of 8.4 pounds (range, 0.1- 44 lb), and most (87%) program participants reported at least some weight loss.

The means for body mass index, weight, waist circumference, confidence in ability to be physically active, and confidence in ability to eat healthfully improved significantly after participation. Approximately 92% of participants reported an increase in confidence in their ability to eat healthy. Increased confidence in ability to be physically activity was reported by 82% of participants. Over 90% of participants reported being more mindful of what and how much they ate and over 70% of participants reported improvements in calorie consumption, fruit and vegetable intake, and fast food intake.

Approximately 60% of participants reported a lifelong struggle with their weight; this was the first weight-loss class for approximately 33% of participants. Preprogram body mass index was highest among those who had struggled with their weight and been in courses before. Change in confidence in ability to eat healthfully was significant and was greatest among participants who had struggled with their weight most of their lives and who were taking their first course.
