= Eric Hentges =

- Eric Hengtes
- Born: 1952

Eric J. Hentges was the executive director of the International Life Sciences Institute, a non-profit international organization founded in 1978 to address food safety, nutrition, and toxicology issues from 2007 until 2018. He was born on December 15, 1952, in Gainesville, Florida, to James and Lavaun Hentges. He is married to Susan Borra (July 7, 2007), and has two daughters from a previous marriage, Rachel and Margot.

Prior to this appointment, he was executive director of the U.S. Department of Agriculture's Center for Nutrition Policy and Promotion (CNPP), where he directed the development and launch of the 2005 Dietary Guidelines. The CNPP is best known for its involvement in the development of the Dietary Guidelines and MyPyramid for Americans and the Food Guidance System.

Hentges joined USDA with over 20 years of experience in nutrition research and education. He has held positions with the National Pork Board, the National Pork Producers Council, and the National Live Stock and Meat Board. He has a Ph.D. in Food Science from Iowa State University, an M.S. from Auburn University and a B.S. from Oklahoma State University.
