= Trans fat regulation =

Regulations covering trans fat in food products

Trans fat regulation, that aims to limit the amount of "trans fat" — fat containing trans fatty acids — in industrial food products, has been enacted in many countries. These regulations were motivated by numerous studies that pointed to significant negative health effects of trans fat. It is generally accepted that trans fat in the diet is a contributing factor in several diseases, including cardiovascular disease, diabetes, and cancer.

== History ==
As early as 1956, there were suggestions in the scientific literature that trans fats could be a cause of the large increase in coronary artery disease but after three decades the concerns were still largely unaddressed. Instead, by the 1980s, fats of animal origin had become one of the greatest concerns of dieticians. Activists, such as Phil Sokolof, who took out full-page ads in major newspapers, attacked the use of beef tallow in McDonald's french fries and urged fast-food companies to switch to vegetable oils. The result was an almost overnight switch by most fast-food outlets to trans fats.

Studies in the early 1990s, however, brought renewed scrutiny and confirmation of the negative health impact of trans fats. In 1994, it was estimated that trans fats caused 20,000 deaths annually in the United States from heart disease.

Mandatory food labeling for trans fats was introduced in several countries. Campaigns were launched by activists to bring attention to the issue and change the practices of food manufacturers.

== International regulation ==
The international trade in food is standardized in the Codex Alimentarius. Hydrogenated oils and fats come under the scope of Codex Stan 19. Non-dairy fat spreads are covered by Codex Stan 256-2007. In the Codex Alimentarius, trans fat to be labelled as such is defined as the geometrical isomers of monounsaturated and polyunsaturated fatty acids having non-conjugated [interrupted by at least one methylene group (−CH_{2}−)] carbon-carbon double bonds in the trans configuration. This definition excludes conjugated linoleic acid which is present naturally in human milk, dairy products, and beef. It does not exclude vaccenic acid.

In 2018 the World Health Organization launched a plan to eliminate trans fat from the global food supply. They estimate that trans fat leads to more than 500,000 deaths from cardiovascular disease yearly.

== By country ==
=== Argentina ===
Trans fat content labeling started being required in August 2006. Industrial foods must contain a maximum of 2% of trans fat over total fat, except for ruminant fats, which have no limit.

=== Australia ===
The Australian federal government has indicated that it wants to pursue actively a policy to reduce trans fats from fast foods. The former federal assistant health minister, Christopher Pyne, asked fast food outlets to reduce their trans fat use. A draft plan was proposed, with a September 2007 timetable, to reduce reliance on trans fats and saturated fats.

As of 2018, Australia's food labeling laws do not require trans fats to be shown separately from the total fat content. However, margarine in Australia has been mostly free of trans fat since 1996.

=== Austria ===
Trans fat content limited to 4% of total fat, 2% on products that contain more than 20% fat.

=== Belgium ===
The Conseil Supérieur de la Santé published in 2012 a science-policy advisory report on industrially produced trans fatty acids that focuses on the general population. Its recommendation to the legislature was to prohibit more than 2 g of trans fatty acids per 100 g of fat in food products.

=== Brazil ===
Resolution 360 of 23 December 2003 by the Brazilian ministry of health required for the first time in the country that the amount of trans fat to be specified in labels of food products. On 31 July 2006, such labelling of trans fat contents became mandatory. In 2019 Anvisa published a new legislation to reduce the total amount of trans fat in any industrialized food sold in Brazil to a maximum of 2% by the end of 2023.

=== Canada ===
In a process that began in 2004, Health Canada finally banned partially hydrogenated oils (PHOs), the primary source of industrially produced trans fats in foods, in September 2018.

On 15 September 2017, Health Canada announced that trans fat will be completely banned effective on 15 September 2018. and the ban came into effect in September 2018, banning partially hydrogenated oils (the largest source of industrially produced trans fats in foods). It is now illegal for manufacturers to add partially hydrogenated oils to foods sold in or imported into Canada.

=== Denmark ===
In March 2003, Denmark became the first country to effectively ban artificial trans fat It limited the trans share to 2% of fats and oils destined for human consumption, a standard that partially hydrogenated oil fails. This restriction is on the ingredients rather than the final products. This regulatory approach thus made Denmark the first country in which it was possible to eat "far less" than 1 g of industrially produced trans fats daily, even with a diet including processed foods. One public health study concluded that Danish government's efforts to decrease trans fat intake from 6 g to 1 g per day over 20 years is related to a 50% decrease in deaths from ischemic heart disease.

=== European Union ===
In 2004, the European Food Safety Authority produced a scientific opinion on trans fatty acids, surmising that "higher intakes of TFA may increase risk for coronary heart disease".

From 2 April 2021 foods in the EU intended for consumers are required to contain less than 2g of industrial trans fat per 100g of fat.

=== Greece ===
Law in Greece limits content of trans fats sold in school canteens to 0.1% (Ministerial Decision Υ1γ/ΓΠ/οικ 81025/ΦΕΚ 2135/τ.Β'/29-08-2013 as modified by Ministerial Decision Υ1γ/ Γ.Π/οικ 96605/ΦΕΚ 2800 τ.Β/4-11-201).

=== Iceland ===
Total trans fat content was limited in 2010 to 2% of total fat content.

=== Israel ===
Since 2014, it is obligatory to mark food products with more than 2% (by weight) fat. The nutritional facts must contain the amount of trans fats.

=== Romania ===
On 19 August 2020, the president promulgated Law 182/2020 that limits trans fats to 2 grams per every 100 grams of fat, max. The food producers who will not conform will be fined with a sum ranging between 10,000 and 30,000 lei. It will come into force on the 1st of April 2020, and it was initiated in 2017 by Save Romania Union senator Adrian Wiener.

=== Saudi Arabia ===
The Saudi Food and Drug Authority (SFDA) requires importers and manufacturer to write the trans fats amounts in the nutritional facts labels of food products according to the requirements of Saudi Standard Specifications/Gulf Specifications.

Starting in 2020, Saudi Minister of Health announced the ban of trans fat in all food products due to their health risks.

=== Singapore ===
The Ministry of Health announced a total ban on partially-hydrogenated oils (PHOs) on 6 March 2019. The target was set to ban PHOs by June 2021, with the aim of encouraging healthy eating habits. The total ban on PHOs took effect on 1 June 2021.

=== Sweden ===
The parliament gave the government a mandate in 2011 to submit without delay a law prohibiting the use of industrially produced trans fats in foods, as of 2017 the law has not yet been implemented.

=== Switzerland ===
Switzerland followed Denmark's trans fats ban, and implemented its own starting in April 2008.

=== United Kingdom ===
In October 2005, the Food Standards Agency (FSA) asked for better labelling in the UK. In the edition of 29 July 2006 of the British Medical Journal, an editorial also called for better labelling. In January 2007, the British Retail Consortium announced that major UK retailers, including Asda, Boots, Co-op Food, Iceland, Marks and Spencer, Sainsbury's, Tesco and Waitrose intended to cease adding trans fatty acids to their own products by the end of 2007.

On 13 December 2007, the Food Standards Agency issued news releases stating that voluntary measures to reduce trans fats in food had already resulted in safe levels of consumer intake.

On 15 April 2010, a British Medical Journal editorial called for trans fats to be "virtually eliminated in the United Kingdom by next year".

The June 2010 National Institute for Health and Clinical Excellence (NICE) report Prevention of cardiovascular disease declared that 40,000 cardiovascular disease deaths in 2006 were "mostly preventable". To achieve this, NICE offered 24 recommendations including product labelling, public education, protecting under–16s from marketing of unhealthy foods, promoting exercise and physically active travel, and even reforming the Common Agricultural Policy to reduce production of unhealthy foods. Fast-food outlets were mentioned as a risk factor, with (in 2007) 170 g of McDonald's fries and 160 g nuggets containing 6 to 8 g of trans fats, conferring a substantially increased risk of coronary artery disease death. NICE made three specific recommendation for diet: (1) reduction of dietary salt to 3 g per day by 2025; (2) halving consumption of saturated fats; and (3) eliminating the use of industrially produced trans fatty acids in food. However, the recommendations were greeted unhappily by the food industry, which stated that it was already voluntarily dropping the trans fat levels to below the WHO recommendations of a maximum of 2%.

Rejecting an outright ban, the Health Secretary Andrew Lansley launched on 15 March 2012 a voluntary pledge to remove artificial trans fats by the end of the year. Asda, Pizza Hut, Burger King, Tesco, Unilever and United Biscuits are some of 73 businesses who have agreed to do so. Lansley and his special Adviser Bill Morgan formerly worked for firms with interests in the food industry and some journalists have alleged that this results in a conflict of interest. Many health professionals are not happy with the voluntary nature of the deal. Simon Capewell, Professor of Clinical Epidemiology at the University of Liverpool, felt that justifying intake on the basis of average figures was unsuitable since some members of the community could considerably exceed this.

=== United States ===
On 11 July 2003, the Food and Drug Administration (FDA) issued a regulation requiring manufacturers to list trans fat on the Nutrition Facts panel of foods and some dietary supplements. Trans fat is defined as "all unsaturated fatty acids that contain one or more isolated (i.e., nonconjugated) double bonds in a trans configuration", therefore excluding conjugated fatty acids such as the conjugated linoleic acids. The new labeling rule became mandatory across the board on 1 January 2006, even for companies that petitioned for extensions. However, unlike in many other countries, trans fat levels of less than 0.5 grams per serving can be listed as 0 grams trans fat on the food label. According to a study published in the Journal of Public Policy & Marketing, without an interpretive footnote or further information on recommended daily value, many consumers do not know how to interpret the meaning of trans fat content on the Nutrition Facts panel. Without specific prior knowledge about trans fat and its negative health effects, consumers, including those at risk for heart disease, may misinterpret nutrient information provided on the panel. The FDA did not approve nutrient content claims such as "trans fat free" or "low trans fat", as they could not determine a "recommended daily value". Nevertheless, the agency is planning a consumer study to evaluate the consumer understanding of such claims and perhaps consider a regulation allowing their use on packaged foods. However, there is no requirement to list trans fats on institutional food packaging; thus bulk purchasers such as schools, hospitals, jails and cafeterias are unable to evaluate the trans fat content of commercial food items.

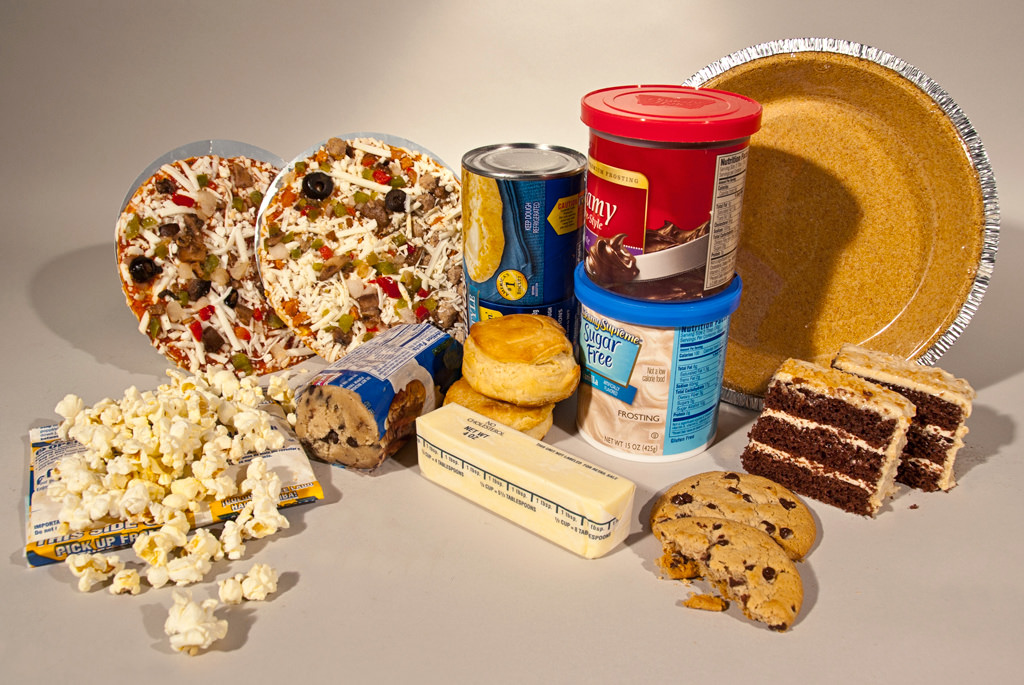
Examples of products that once contained dangerous amounts of trans fat in the United States, from an FDA publication.

Critics of the plan, including FDA advisor Dr. Carlos Camargo, have expressed concern that the 0.5 gram per serving threshold is too high to refer to a food as free of trans fat. This is because a person eating many servings of a product, or eating multiple products over the course of the day may still consume a significant amount of trans fat. Despite this, the FDA estimates that by 2009, trans fat labeling will have prevented from 600 to 1,200 cases of coronary artery disease, and 250 to 500 deaths, yearly. This benefit is expected to result from consumers choosing alternative foods lower in trans fats, and manufacturers reducing the amount of trans fats in their products.

The American Medical Association supports any state and federal efforts to ban the use of artificial trans fats in U.S. restaurants and bakeries.

The American Public Health Association adopted a new policy statement regarding trans fats in 2007. These new guidelines, entitled Restricting Trans Fatty Acids in the Food Supply, recommend that the government require nutrition facts labeling of trans fats on all commercial food products. They also urge federal, state, and local governments to ban and monitor use of trans fats in restaurants. Furthermore, the APHA recommends barring the sales and availability of foods containing significant amounts of trans fat in public facilities including universities, prisons, and day care facilities etc.

In January 2007, faced with the prospect of an outright ban on the sale of their product, Crisco was reformulated to meet the United States Food and Drug Administration (FDA) definition of "zero grams trans fats per serving" (that is less than one gram per tablespoon, or up to 7% by weight; or less than 0.5 grams per serving size) by boosting the saturation and then diluting the resulting solid fat with unsaturated vegetable oils.

In 2010, according to the FDA, the average American consumed 5.8 grams of trans fat per day (2.6% of energy intake). Monoglycerides and diglycerides are not considered fats by the FDA, despite their nearly equal calorie per weight contribution during ingestion.

On 7 November 2013, the FDA issued a preliminary determination that trans fats are not "generally recognized as safe", which was widely seen as a precursor to reclassifying trans fats as a "food additive," meaning they could not be used in foods without specific regulatory authorization. This would have the effect of virtually eliminating trans fats from the US food supply. The ruling was formally enacted on 16 June 2015, requiring that within three years, by 18 June 2018 no food prepared in the United States is allowed to include trans fats, unless approved by the FDA.

The FDA agreed in May 2018 to give companies one more year to find other ingredients for enhancing product flavors or grease industrial baking pans, effectively banning trans fats in the United States from May 2019 onwards. Also, while new products can no longer be made with trans fats, they will give foods already on the shelves some time to cycle out of the market.

==== State and local regulation ====
Even before the federal ban, the state of California and several U.S. cities took action to reduce consumption of trans fats.

In 2005, Tiburon, California, became the first American city where all restaurants voluntarily cook with trans fat-free oils. In 2007, Montgomery County, Maryland, approved a ban on partially hydrogenated oils, becoming the first county in the nation to restrict trans fats.

New York City embarked on a campaign in 2005 to reduce consumption of trans fats, noting that heart disease is the primary cause of resident deaths. This has included a public education campaign and a request to restaurant owners to eliminate trans fat from their offerings voluntarily. Finding that the voluntary program was not successful, New York City's Board of Health in 2006 solicited public comments on a proposal to ban artificial trans fats in restaurants. The board voted to ban trans fat in restaurant food on 5 December 2006. New York was the first large US city to strictly limit trans fats in restaurants. Restaurants were barred from using most frying and spreading fats containing artificial trans fats above 0.5 g per serving on 1 July 2007, and were supposed to have met the same target in all of their foods by 1 July 2008.

The Philadelphia City Council unanimously voted to enact a ban in February 2007. The ordinance does not apply to prepackaged foods sold in the city, but did require restaurants in the city to stop frying food in trans fats by 1 September 2007. The ordinance also contained a provision going into effect one year later that barred trans fat from being used as an ingredient in commercial kitchens. On 10 October 2007, the Philadelphia City Council approved the use of trans fats by small bakeries throughout the city.

Albany County of New York passed a ban on trans fats. The ban was adopted after a unanimous vote by the county legislature on 14 May 2007. The decision was made after New York City's decision, but no plan has been put into place. Legislators received a letter from Rick J. Sampson, president and CEO of the New York State Restaurant Association, calling on them to "delay any action on this issue until the full impact of the New York City ban is known."

San Francisco officially asked its restaurants to stop using trans fat in January 2008. The voluntary program will grant a city decal to restaurants that comply and apply for the decal. Legislators say the next step will be a mandatory ban.

Chicago also passed partial ban on oils and posting requirements for fast food restaurants.

Trans fat bans were also introduced in the state legislatures of Massachusetts, Maryland, and Vermont.

In March 2008, the Boston Public Health Commission's Board of Health passed a regulation food service establishments from selling foods containing artificial trans fats at more than 0.5 grams per serving, which is similar to the New York City regulation; there are some exceptions for clearly labeled packaged foods and charitable bake sales.

In July 2008, California became the first state to ban trans fats in restaurants effective 1 January 2010; Governor Arnold Schwarzenegger signed the bill into law. California restaurants are prohibited from using oil, shortening, and margarine containing artificial trans fats in spreads or for frying, with the exception of deep frying doughnuts. As of 1 January 2011, doughnuts and other baked goods have been prohibited from containing artificial trans fats. Packaged foods are not covered by the ban and can legally contain trans fats.

==== 2015–2018 federal phaseout ====
In 2009, at the age of 94, University of Illinois professor Fred Kummerow, a trans fat researcher who had campaigned for decades for a federal ban on the substance, filed a petition with the U.S. Food and Drug Administration (FDA) seeking elimination of artificial trans fats from the U.S. food supply. The FDA did not act on his petition for four years, and in 2013 Kummerow filed a lawsuit against the FDA and the U.S. Department of Health and Human Services, seeking to compel the FDA to respond to his petition and "to ban partially hydrogenated oils unless a complete administrative review finds new evidence for their safety." Kummerow's petition stated that "Artificial trans fat is a poisonous and deleterious substance, and the FDA has acknowledged the danger."

Three months after the suit was filed, on 16 June 2015, the FDA moved to eliminate artificial trans fats from the U.S. food supply, giving manufacturers a deadline of three years. The FDA specifically ruled that trans fat was not generally recognized as safe and "could no longer be added to food after 18 June 2018, unless a manufacturer could present convincing scientific evidence that a particular use was safe." Kummerow stated: "Science won out."

The ban is believed to prevent about 90,000 premature deaths annually. The FDA estimates the ban will cost the food industry $6.2 billion over 20 years as the industry reformulates products and substitutes new ingredients for trans fat. The benefits are estimated at $140 billion over 20 years mainly from lower health care spending. Food companies can petition the FDA for approval of specific uses of partially hydrogenated oils if the companies submit data proving the oils' use is safe.

=== Manufacturer response ===
Palm oil, a natural oil extracted from the fruit of oil palm trees that is semi-solid at room temperature (15–25 degrees Celsius), can potentially serve as a substitute for partially hydrogenated fats in baking and processed food applications, although there is disagreement about whether replacing partially hydrogenated fats with palm oil confers any health benefits. A 2006 study supported by the National Institutes of Health and the USDA Agricultural Research Service concluded that palm oil is not a safe substitute for partially hydrogenated fats (trans fats) in the food industry, because palm oil results in adverse changes in the blood concentrations of LDL and apolipoprotein B just as trans fat does.

The J.M. Smucker Company, American manufacturer of Crisco (the original partially hydrogenated vegetable shortening), in 2004 released a new formulation made from solid saturated palm oil cut with soybean oil and sunflower oil. This blend yielded an equivalent shortening much like the prior partially hydrogenated Crisco, and was labelled zero grams of trans fat per 1 tablespoon serving (as compared with 1.5 grams per tablespoon of original Crisco). As of 24 January 2007, Smucker claims that all Crisco shortening products in the US have been reformulated to contain less than one gram of trans fat per serving while keeping saturated fat content less than butter. The separately marketed trans fat free version introduced in 2004 was discontinued.

On 22 May 2004, Unilever, the corporate descendant of Joseph Crosfield & Sons (the original producer of Wilhelm Normann's hydrogenation hardened oils) announced that they have eliminated trans fats from all their margarine products in Canada, including their flagship Becel brand.

== See also ==
- Diet and heart disease
- Health crisis
- Fat interesterification
