= Fat hydrogenation =

Addition of hydrogen atoms to fat molecules

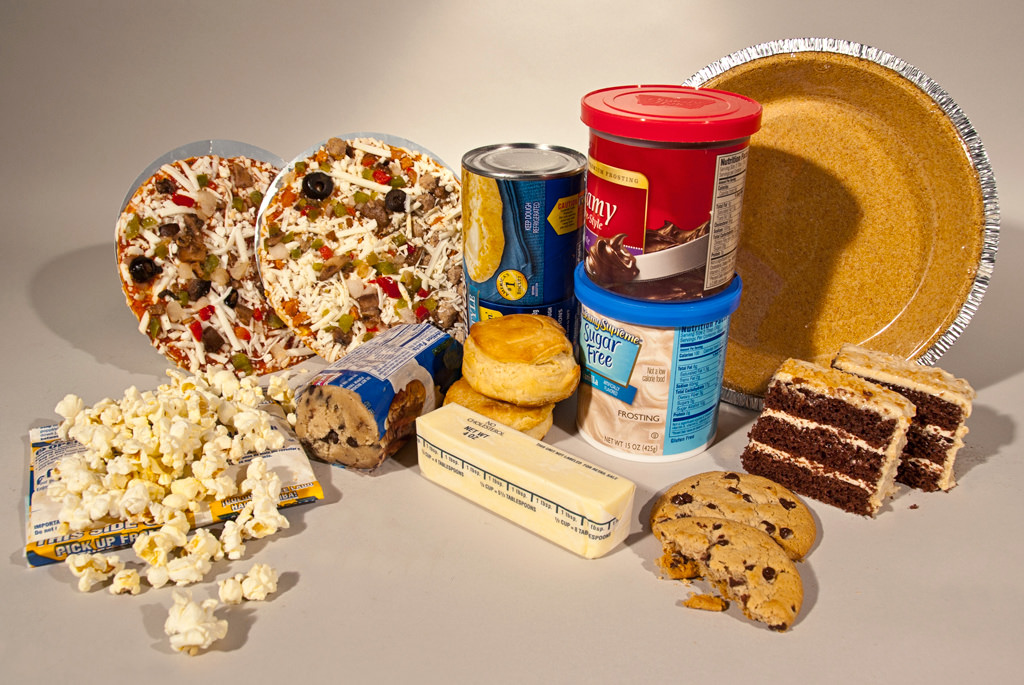
Products with partially hydrogenated fat

Fat hydrogenation is the process of combining unsaturated fat with hydrogen in order to partially or completely convert it into saturated fat. Typically this hydrogenation is done with liquid vegetable oils resulting in solid or semi-solid fats.

Changing the degree of saturation of the fat changes some important physical properties, such as the melting range, which is why liquid oils become semi-solid. Solid or semi-solid fats are preferred for some baked goods such as biscuits and pie dough because how the fat mixes with flour produces a more desirable, crumbly texture in the baked product. Because partially hydrogenated vegetable oils are cheaper than animal fats, are available in a wide range of consistencies, and have other desirable characteristics such as increased oxidative stability and longer shelf life, they are the predominant fats used as shortening in most commercial baked goods.

The process is typically carried out at very high pressure, with the help of a nickel catalyst that is removed from the final product.

== Process ==
Hydrogenating vegetable oil is done by raising a blend of vegetable oil and a metal catalyst, typically nickel, in near-vacuum to very high temperatures, and introducing hydrogen. This causes the carbon atoms of the oil to break double-bonds with other carbons. Each carbon atom becomes single-bonded to an individual hydrogen atom, and the double bond between carbons can no longer exist.

The desirable (left) and undesirable pathways for partial hydrogenation of an unsaturated fat. Elaidic acid is a trans fat with negative health effects.

Full hydrogenation results in the conversion of all of the unsaturated fats into saturated fats by transforming all of the double bonds in the fat into single bonds. Partial hydrogenation reduces some, but not all, of the double bonds by the partial replacement with single bonds. The degree of hydrogenation is controlled by restricting the amount of hydrogen, reaction temperature and time, and the catalyst.

== History ==
Wilhelm Normann patented the hydrogenation of liquid oils in 1902

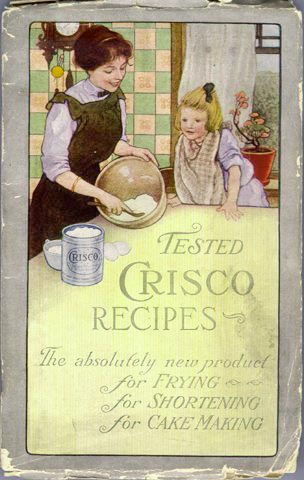
Cover of original Crisco cookbook, 1912

Nobel Prize laureate Paul Sabatier worked in the late 1890s to develop the chemistry of hydrogenation. Whereas Sabatier considered hydrogenation of only vapors, the German chemist Wilhelm Normann showed in 1901 that liquid oils could be hydrogenated, and patented the process in 1902. Normann's hydrogenation process made it possible to stabilize affordable whale oil or fish oil for human consumption, a practice kept secret to avoid consumer distaste. During the years 1905–1910, Normann built a fat-hardening facility in the Herford company. At the same time, the invention was extended to a large-scale plant in Warrington, England, at Joseph Crosfield & Sons, Limited. It took only two years until the hardened fat could be successfully produced in the plant in Warrington, commencing production in late 1909. The initial year's production totalled nearly 3,000 tonnes. In 1909, Procter & Gamble acquired the United States rights to the Normann patent; in 1911, they began marketing the first hydrogenated shortening, Crisco (composed largely of partially hydrogenated cottonseed oil). Further success came from the marketing technique of giving away free cookbooks in which every recipe called for Crisco.

Before 1910, dietary fats in industrialized nations consisted mostly of butterfat, beef tallow, and lard. During Napoleon's reign in France in the early 19th century, a type of margarine was invented to feed troops using tallow and buttermilk. Soybeans began to be imported into the U.S. as a source of protein in the early 20th century, resulting in an abundance of soybean oil as a by-product that could be turned into a solid fat, thereby addressing a shortage of butterfat. With the advent of refrigeration, margarines based on hydrogenated fats presented the advantage that, unlike butter, they could be taken out of a refrigerator and immediately spread on bread. Some minor changes to the chemical composition of hydrogenated fats yielded superior baking properties compared to lard. As a result of these factors, margarine made from partially hydrogenated soybean oil began to replace butterfat. Partially hydrogenated fat such as Crisco and Spry, sold in England, began to replace butter and lard in baking bread, pies, cookies, and cakes in 1920.

Production of partially hydrogenated fats increased steadily in the 20th century as processed vegetable fats replaced animal fats in the U.S. and other Western countries. At first, the argument was a financial one due to the lower costs of margarines and shortenings compared to lard and butter, particularly for restaurants and manufacturers. However, during the 1980s regulators, physicians, nutritionists, popular health media, educational curricula and cookbooks began to promote diets low in saturated fats for health reasons. Advocacy groups in the U.S. responded by demanding the replacement of saturated animal and tropical fats with vegetable alternatives. The Center for Science in the Public Interest (CSPI) campaigned vigorously against the use of saturated fats by corporations, including fast-food restaurants, endorsing trans fats as a healthier alternative. The National Heart Savers Association took out full page ads in major newspapers, attacking the use of beef tallow in McDonald's French fries. They urged multinational fast-food restaurants and food manufacturers to switch to vegetable oils, and almost all targeted firms responded by replacing saturated fats with trans fats.

Since then the food industry has moved away from partially hydrogenated fats in response to the health concerns about trans fats, labeling requirements, and removal of trans fats from permitted food additives. They have been replaced with fully hydrogenated fats, vegetable oils that are naturally higher in saturated fat and therefore more solid at room temperature, such as palm oil and coconut oil, and interesterified fats, which cannot result in the formation of trans fats.

== Issues ==
Cis–trans isomerization of some of the remaining unsaturated carbon bonds to their trans isomers during the partial hydrogenation process produces trans fat, which can increase the risk of cardiovascular problems. The conversion from cis to trans bonds is favored because the trans configuration has lower energy than the natural cis one. At equilibrium, the trans/cis isomer ratio is about 2:1.

== See also ==
- Hydrotreated vegetable oil
