= Octadecadienoic acid =

Octadecadienoic acid may refer to:

- Conjugated linoleic acids
- Linoleic acid, (9Z,12Z)-9,12-octadecadienoic acid
- Linolelaidic acid, (9E,12E)-9,12-octadecadienoic acid
- Rumenic acid, (9Z,11E)-9,11-octadecadienoic acid
- Taxoleic acid, (5Z,9Z)-5,9-octadecadienoic acid
- Laballenic acid, 5,6-octadecadienoic acid
