= Aunt Jenny's Real Life Stories =

Aunt Jenny’s Real Life Stories
- Aunt Jenny's recipes (1943)
- Running time: 15 minutes
- Country of origin: United States
- Syndicates: CBS
- Starring: Edith Spencer; Agnes Young
- Announcer: Dan Seymour; Peter Thomas
- Narrated by: Edith Spencer, Agnes Young
- Original release: January 18, 1937 – November 16, 1956
- Opening theme: "Believe Me, If All Those Endearing Young Charms"
- Sponsored by: Spry shortening

Edith Spencer as Aunt Jenny

Aunt Jenny's Real Life Stories was a 15-minute radio drama that aired January 18, 1937, to November 16, 1956, on CBS, sponsored by Spry shortening. The program was heard weekdays at 11:45 a.m. until 1946, when it moved to 12:15 p.m.

Unlike most continuing soap operas, on Monday of each week a new, self-contained storyline was begun, one which would then reach its conclusion on Friday. A review in the trade publication Radio Daily noted that the program's "dramatic playlets with popular appeal plots hold good human interest." Aunt Jenny (Edith Spencer, Agnes Young) offered cooking tips and homespun philosophy from her home in Littleton where she lived on Indian Hill with her canary (Henry Boyd). Her full name was Jennifer F. Wheeler.

Aunt Jenny's recipes often included a mention of her sponsor, Spry shortening. Jimmy Dwan supplied the sound effects of rattling pots and pans. Every day, her friend Danny (announcer Dan Seymour) would drop by for a chat in her kitchen. Then Aunt Jenny would introduce and narrate one of her stories. These were five-chapter daytime dramas with different casts in stories which came to a conclusion on Fridays. One actor who began his radio career on this series was Richard Widmark. Eleanor Abbey also was a member of the cast.

Aunt Jenny was a widow, but in early episodes she was married to Calvin, who edited the Littleton News.

The show's theme was a strings interpretation of "Believe Me, If All Those Endearing Young Charms", and the background music was supplied by organist Elsie Thompson. Various Aunt Jenny cookbooks were offered as Spry premiums.

Seymour was the announcer from the program's debut until 1954, when his duties at an advertising agency caused him to retire from broadcasting. He was replaced by Peter Thomas.

There was a Canadian equivalent of Aunt Jenny: Aunt Lucy.

== Satire ==
For years, this series was satirized on a regular basis on various Bob and Ray shows as "Aunt Penny's Sunlit Kitchen", with Bob Elliott as Danny and Ray Goulding as Aunt Penny. Spoofing Aunt Jenny's references to Spry shortening, Aunt Penny would constantly mention that her cookies were baked in chicken fat, because "If you're using chicken fat, it's digestible... It won't sit in your stomach like a half-dollar piece". With Danny's bumbling interference, Aunt Penny was never able to complete a story.

== Listen to ==
- Aunt Jenny

== See also ==
- List of radio soaps
