= Aunt Jenny =

Advertising character for Spry Vegetable Shortening

Edith Spencer as Aunt Jenny

Aunt Jenny was an advertising character created for Spry Vegetable Shortening. Primarily portrayed by Edith Spencer, Aunt Jenny was best known as host and narrator of the long-lived radio show, Aunt Jenny’s Real Life Stories (January 18, 1937 – November 16, 1956), but she was also seen promoting the product in drawings, photographs and cookbooks.

== Origins ==
In 1936, Lever Brothers, part of the corporation Unilever, introduced Spry Vegetable Shortening as a competitor to Crisco, produced by Procter & Gamble. Aunt Jenny was intended to give a pleasant face to what might otherwise be seen as a boring or at least uninspiring product, therefore presenting a challenge to writers of advertisement copy. Sometimes even Jenny’s writers seemed to be reaching for things to say—on the final page of the Aunt Jenny’s Favorite Recipes cookbook appears a blurb boasting that doughnuts made with Spry are “so light and digestible a child can eat ‘em.” For the most part, however, Aunt Jenny was successful, and within months Spry had taken nearly half of Crisco’s market share.

In appearance, Aunt Jenny was portrayed as a slightly plump, grandmotherly woman with white hair, thin spectacles, and a baking apron. Promotional materials depicted her as a home cook who spoke in a plain, conversational manner, often dropping the final "g" in words such as "cooking".

== Radio ==
Aunt Jenny’s best-remembered aspect was the long-running radio show, Aunt Jenny’s Real Life Stories, which made its debut on CBS on January 18, 1937. The show took the format of a dramatic serial or soap opera, presenting a different story weekly, and running for 15 minutes from 10:45 a.m. to 11:00 a.m. each weekday morning. The stories featured typical soap opera plots involving the people of a small American town called Littleton. Aunt Jenny herself was not the focus of these stories but served as host and narrator. She also offered cooking instruction, generally in the form of easy recipes which included Spry Vegetable Shortening as an ingredient.

Aunt Jenny was played by Edith Spencer, who served not only as the voice of Jenny but also provided her visual appearance in promotional materials. The announcer of the show was actor Dan Seymour. Animal imitator Henry Boyd provided the warbling of Aunt Jenny’s canary. Like most soap operas, the show had a large revolving cast over the years, serving as a springboard into professional acting for future stars, such as Richard Widmark. Eventually, Edith Spencer left the show and was replaced by Agnes Young, who sounded reasonably similar to Spencer but did not look like her. Finally, on September 28, 1956, the show’s long run came to an end.

The Major Broadcasting Network produced an Australian version of Aunt Jenny featuring Ethel Lang in the lead role.

== Cookbooks and print advertisements ==
Aunt Jenny also appeared in numerous print ads found in women's magazines, as well as several promotional cookbooks. These were generally illustrated with photographs of Edith Spencer as Jenny, but after Spencer’s departure from the radio show, they displayed artwork based on her likeness. The character of Aunt Jenny was phased out after the radio show left the air, and Unilever eventually discontinued Spry Vegetable Shortening.

Cookbooks featuring the Aunt Jenny character:

- Aunt Jenny’s Favorite Recipes (48 pages with b/w illustrations, plus index)
- Aunt Jenny's Old Fashioned Christmas Cookies Cookbook (21 pages, 1952)
- Aunt Jenny's 12 Pies Husbands Like Best (21 pages, 1952)
- Aunt Jenny's Recipe Cookbook
- Aunt Jenny: Home Baking Made Easy
- Good Cooking made Easy, Spry the flavor saver (48 pages, 1942; comments by Aunt Jenny throughout)
