= Cottolene =

U.S. brand of shortening

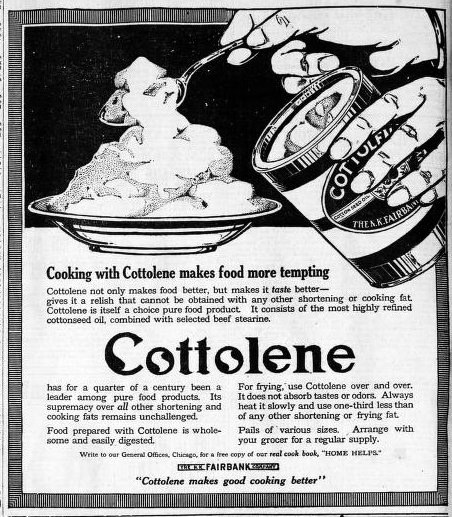
Cottolene ad, 1915

Cottolene was a brand of shortening made of beef suet and cottonseed oil produced in the United States from the late 1880s until the mid-20th century. It was the first mass-produced and mass-marketed alternative to cooking with lard, and is remembered today for its iconic national ad campaign and the cookbooks that were written to promote its use.

== History ==
=== Background ===
The concept for Cottolene emerged as an offshoot of two industries. Cotton seeds were a high oil-content waste product of the cotton industry, and beef tallow was a waste product of the meat-processing industry. N. K. Fairbank Co. of Chicago seized upon this glut and created a product catering to late-19th-century Americans' growing infatuation with labor-saving packaged foods for the "dainty" (or "lard-free") diet (according to Dr. Alice Ross, writing in the Journal of Antiques and Collectibles.)

=== Development and features ===
Techniques employing nickel-based alloys used in the isolation and removal of consumable hydrogenated vegetable oils from plants, especially cottonseed, were pioneered by the efforts of Fairbank chemist James F. Boyce. Incorporating these advances into the limited cooking oils market at the time resulted in the creation of Cottolene, a product containing 90% vegetable fat. This quickly became a popular culinary replacement for cooking butters and lard, substances that had been used in kitchens for centuries and known to be unhealthy.

Cottolene imparted no additional strong flavors when used in food preparation, and was marketed as purer and more natural than lard. The shortening dominated the vegetable cooking oil market until competitor Procter & Gamble unveiled Crisco in the early-20th-century. Packaged similarly in metal pails—and also marketed with accompanying cookbooks—Crisco was composed entirely of vegetable oils, and became the preferred brand found in many kitchens of the day.
