= Trans fat =

Type of unsaturated fat

Trans fat is a type of unsaturated fat that occurs in foods. Trans fats are fats (triglycerides, i.e. triple esters of glycerin) that contain chains derived from trans fatty acids. Trans fatty acids are unsaturated fatty acids that contain a double bond in the trans conformation.

Small amounts of trans fats occur naturally in animal and dairy products, but large amounts are found in some processed foods made with partially hydrogenated oils. Because consumption of trans fats is associated with increased risk for cardiovascular diseases, artificial trans fats are highly regulated or banned in many countries. However, they are still widely consumed in developing nations where they are associated with increased risk of diabetes, cardiovascular diseases, and death.

In 2015, the US Food and Drug Administration (FDA) determined that artificial trans fats made from partially hydrogenated oils (PHOs) were not generally recognized as safe. As a result, these oils were banned from foods sold in the US beginning June 18, 2018, with limited extensions for specific, approved uses until 2020 or 2021.

Following the US action, other governing bodies, including the European Union, Canada, Australia, and New Zealand introduced restrictions or bans on the use of partially hydrogenated oils and industrial trans fats in food manufacturing.

The World Health Organization (WHO) set a global goal to eliminate industrially produced trans fat by the end of 2023. The goal was not fully achieved. In 2024, the WHO announced an updated plan for accelerated action through 2025 to complete global elimination efforts.

== Occurrence ==
Trans fats occur naturally in the fats of products made from ruminant animals, such as cheese or butter. Some trans fats are the result of food processing, especially when applied to cooking oils and margarine.

=== Naturally-occurring trans fats ===
Vaccenic acid, a naturally occurring trans fatty acid, comprises 0.4–4% of the total fatty acid content in dairy milk.

Trans fats occur in meat and dairy products from ruminants. For example, butter contains about 3% trans fat by weight. These naturally occurring trans fats include conjugated linoleic acid (CLA) and vaccenic acid (trans-11 18:1). They arise from the action of bacteria in the rumen. Polyunsaturated fats are toxic to the rumen-based bacteria, which detoxify the fats by changing some cis-double bonds to trans-double bonds. In contrast to industrially produced trans fats, this bacterial process produces only a few specific isomers.

Conjugated trans fatty acids such as CLA are exempt from counting as trans fat in the US. The Codex Alimentarius includes an analogous exclusion.

As industrial sources of trans fats are eliminated, increased attention focuses on ruminant derived trans fats. Not all ruminant-derived trans fats are innocuous like vaccenic acid and its metabolite rumenic acid (cis-9-trans-11 CLA / 18:2). In particular, trans-10 18:1 is not turned into a conjugated linoleic acid by humans. It appears to have health consequences comparable to trans fats of industrial origin.

=== Hydrogenation ===
The hydrogenation process was widely adopted by the food industry in the early 1900s; first for the production of margarine, a replacement for butter and shortening, and eventually for various other fats used in snack food, packaged baked goods, and deep fried products.

Hydrogenation makes the fat more saturated, which has desirable properties:

- The shelf life of fats correlates with the degree of saturation: polyunsaturated fats are prone to autoxidation whereas saturated fats, being virtually inert in air, have very long shelf lives.
- Saturated fats tend to be more solid at room temperature. This property is important for margarine, one of the original uses for fat hydrogenation.

However, an isomerization side reaction during fat hydrogenation can convert remaining unsaturated fats to the thermodynamically favored trans isomer.

The desirable (left) and undesirable pathways for partial hydrogenation of an unsaturated fat.

Prior to trans fat regulation, hydrogenation is generally not performed fully, resulting in partially hydrogenated fat. The goal is to have some unsaturated bonds (C=C bonds) to remain to target a specific melting point and hardness. However, due to the isomerization side reaction, a significant fraction of this remaining unsaturated fat is turned into trans fat. This side reaction accounts for most of the trans fatty acids consumed in an industrialized society of the 1990s-2000s, by far.

Regulation has led to some desire in tweaking for lower trans fat levels. The standard 140 kPa (20 psi) process of partial hydrogenation produces a product of about 40% trans fatty acid by weight, compared to about 17% using higher pressures of hydrogen. Blended with unhydrogenated liquid soybean oil, the high-pressure-processed oil produced margarine containing 5 to 6% trans fat. Based on 2005 U.S. labeling requirements (see below), the manufacturer could claim the product was free of trans fat. The level of trans fat may also be altered by modification of the temperature and the length of time during hydrogenation.

Further regulation and consumer awareness has led to wider adoption of fully hydrogenated fats, which contain no trans fat due to an absence of double bonds. The "overshoot" in melting point and hardness could be combated by mixing in another fat, sometimes using interesterification to produce a more even blend. Plant oils rich in monounsaturated fats and saturated fats have also replaced some uses of hydrogenated fats. The technology has improved such that a 2021 review indicates that trans fat from hydrogenated fats is no longer a problem in modern countries.

=== Thermal isomerization ===
When heated (cooked), some unsaturated fats change from their normal geometry to trans. The rate of isomerization is accelerated by free radicals.

== History ==
There were suggestions in the scientific literature as early as 1956 that trans fats could cause an increase in coronary artery disease. Studies in the early 1990s brought renewed scrutiny and confirmation of the negative health impact of trans fats. In 1994, it was estimated that trans fats caused at least 20,000 deaths annually in the U.S. from heart disease. In the 1990s, activist organization Center for Science in the Public Interest (CSPI) called for reducing trans fats in foods, and later lobbied for them to be disclosed on product labels and menus. (Note: References: Centre for Science in the Public Interest (1999). "Health Advocates Tell Top Restaurants 'Get an Oil Change'".; Jacobson MF (2004). "Good riddance to Trans!". Nutrition Action Healthletter. No. 31. Center for Science in the Public Interest. Cited in.; Centre for Science in the Public Interest (2018). "Artificial Trans Fat: A Timeline".) Several lawsuits were launched against high-visibility restaurants and food manufacturers with the objective of supporting a broader phase-out of trans fats.

Mandatory food labeling was introduced in several countries and Denmark was first to mandate limits on industrially produced trans fats in 2004. In January 2007, faced with the prospect of an outright ban on the sale of their product, Crisco was reformulated to meet the U.S. Food and Drug Administration (FDA) definition of "zero grams trans fats per serving" (that is less than one gram per tablespoon, or up to 7% by weight; or less than 0.5 grams per serving size) by boosting the saturation and then diluting the resulting solid fat with unsaturated vegetable oils. Noting that elimination of industrially produced trans fat is feasible and achievable, the World Health Organization (WHO) has set a goal to make the world free from industrially produced trans fat by the end of 2023. By the end of 2021, the WHO announced that 40 countries had implemented industrial trans fat elimination policies that "are protecting 1.4 billion people from this deadly food compound" but that 10 of the 15 countries suffering the highest health impacts from trans fats had not yet adopted a policy.

== Structure ==
=== Chemical bonds ===
A fatty acid is characterized as either saturated or unsaturated based on the respective absence or presence of C=C double bonds in its backbone. If the molecule contains no double C=C bonds, it is said to be saturated; otherwise, it is unsaturated to some degree.

The C=C double bond is rotationally rigid. If the hydrogen atoms bonded to each of the carbons in this double bond are on the same side, this is called cis, and leads to a bent molecular chain. If the two hydrogens are on opposite sides, this is called trans, and leads to a straight chain.

Trans unsaturated (Elaidic acid)	Cis unsaturated (Oleic acid)	Saturated (Stearic acid)
Elaidic acid is the main trans unsaturated fatty acid often found in partially hydrogenated vegetable oils.	Oleic acid is a cis unsaturated fatty acid making up 55–80% of olive oil.	Stearic acid is a saturated fatty acid found in animal fats and is the intended product in full hydrogenation. Stearic acid is neither unsaturated nor trans because it has no carbon-carbon double bonds.
These fatty acids are geometric isomers (structurally identical except for the arrangement of the double bond).		This fatty acid contains no carbon-carbon double bonds and is not isomeric with the prior two.

Because trans fats are more linear, they crystallize more easily, allowing them to be solid (rather than liquid) at room temperatures. This has several processing and storage advantages.

In nature, unsaturated fatty acids generally have cis configurations as opposed to trans configurations. Saturated fatty acids (those without any carbon-carbon double bonds) are abundant (see tallow), but they also can be generated from unsaturated fats by the process of fat hydrogenation. In the course of hydrogenation, some cis double bonds convert into trans double bonds. Chemists call this conversion an isomerization reaction.

Any molecule with a C=C double bond can be either a trans or a cis fatty acid depending on the configuration of the double bond. For example, oleic acid and elaidic acid are both unsaturated fatty acids with the chemical formula C_{9}H_{17}C_{9}H_{17}O_{2}. They both have a double bond located midway along the carbon chain. It is the geometry of this bond that sets oleic and elaidic acids apart. They have distinct physical-chemical properties of the molecule. For example, the melting point of elaidic acid is 45 °C, which is higher than that of oleic acid. This notably means that it is a solid at human body temperatures.

== Presence in food ==
Trans fat contents in various foods, ranked in g per 100 g
Food type	Trans fat content
shortenings	10–33
margarine, stick	6.2–16.8
butter	2–7
whole milk	0.07–0.1
breads/cake products	0.1–10
cookies and crackers	1–8
tortilla chips	5.8
cake frostings, sweets	0.1–7
animal fat	0–5
ground beef	1

The trans fat levels can be quantified using various forms of chromatography. The actual chemical entity being measured is trans fatty acids resulting from full hydrolysis of the lipids in a food.

=== Animal fats ===
Trans fatty acids (TFAs) occur in small amounts in meat and milk of ruminants (such as cattle and sheep), typically 2–5% of total fat. Natural TFAs, which include conjugated linoleic acid (CLA) and vaccenic acid, originate in the rumen of these animals. CLA has two double bonds, one in the cis configuration and one in trans, which makes it simultaneously a cis- and a trans-fatty acid. A type of trans fat occurs naturally in the milk and body fat of ruminants (such as cattle and sheep) at a level of 2–5% of total fat.

The US National Dairy Council has asserted that the trans fats present in foods of animal origin are of a different type than those in partially hydrogenated oils, and do not appear to exhibit the same negative effects. A scientific review agrees with the conclusion (stating that "the sum of the current evidence suggests that the Public health implications of consuming trans fats from ruminant products are relatively limited") but cautions that this may be due to the low consumption of trans fats from animal sources compared to artificial ones.

Despite this concern, the NAS dietary recommendations have not included eliminating trans fat from the diet. This is because trans fat is naturally present in many animal foods in trace quantities, and thus its removal from ordinary diets might introduce undesirable side effects and nutritional imbalances if proper nutritional planning is not undertaken. The NAS has, thus, "recommended that trans fatty acid consumption be as low as possible while consuming a nutritionally adequate diet". Like the NAS, the World Health Organization has tried to balance public health goals with a practical level of trans fat consumption, recommending in 2003 that trans fats be limited to less than 1% of overall energy intake.

A meta-analysis showed that all trans fats, regardless of natural or artificial origin equally raise LDL and lower HDL levels. Other studies though have shown different results when it comes to animal based trans fats like conjugated linoleic acid (CLA). Although CLA is known for its anticancer properties, researchers have also found that the cis-9, trans-11 form of CLA can reduce the risk for cardiovascular disease and help fight inflammation.

==== Natural "trans fats" in dairy products ====
Some trans fatty acids occur in natural fats and traditionally processed foods. Vaccenic acid occurs in breast milk, and some isomers of conjugated linoleic acid (CLA) are found in meat and dairy products from ruminants. Butter, for example, contains about 3% trans fat.

=== Processed foods ===
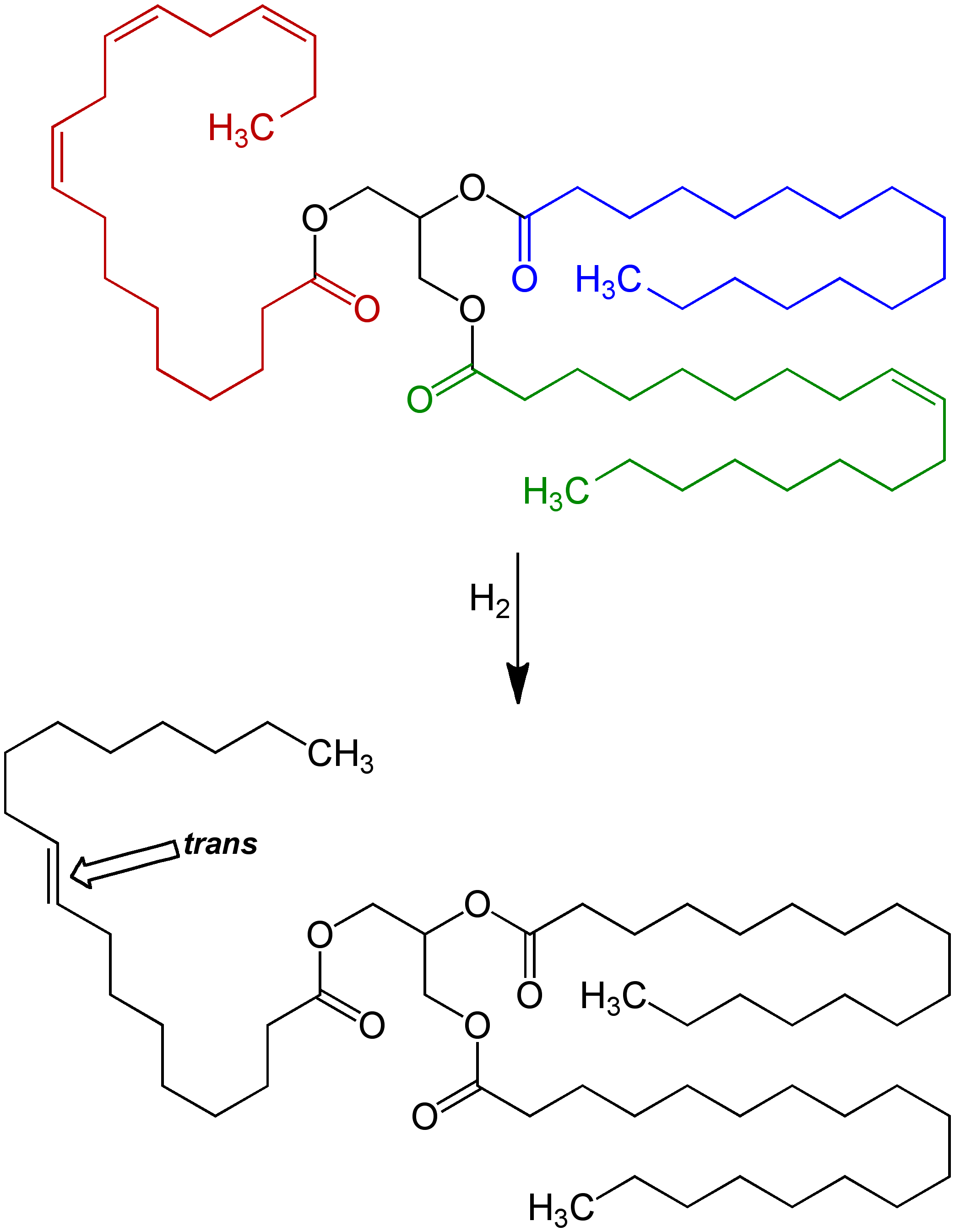
Reaction scheme: Trans fat is created as a side effect of partially catalytic hydrogenation of unsaturated plant fats (generally vegetable oils) with cis carbon-carbon double bonds.

Partially hydrogenated vegetable oils were an increasingly significant part of the human diet for about 100 years, especially after 1950 as processed food rose in popularity.

Animal-based fats were once the only trans fats consumed, but by far the largest amount of trans fat consumed today is created by the processed food industry as a side effect of partially hydrogenating unsaturated plant fats (generally vegetable oils). These partially hydrogenated fats have displaced natural solid fats and liquid oils in many areas, the most notable ones being in the fast food, snack food, fried food, and baked goods industries.

Up to 45% of the total fat in those foods containing human-made trans fats formed by partially hydrogenating plant fats may be trans fat. An analysis of some industrialized foods in 2006 found up to 30% "trans fats" in artificial shortening, 10% in breads and cake products, 8% in cookies and crackers, 4% in salty snacks, 7% in cake frostings and sweets, and 26% in margarine and other processed spreads. Another 2010 analysis however found only 0.2% of trans fats in margarine and other processed spreads.

Foods containing higher amounts of trans fat are associated with fast food restaurants. They are consumed in greater quantities by people who lack access to a diet consisting of fewer partially hydrogenated fats, or who often consume fast food. A diet high in trans fats can contribute to obesity, high blood pressure, and higher risk for heart disease. Trans fat is also implicated in Type 2 diabetes.

=== Shortenings ===
Shortenings, because they are widely used, are of particular concern. Baking shortenings, unless reformulated, contain around 30% trans fats compared to their total fats. High-fat dairy products such as butter contain about 4%. Margarines not reformulated to reduce trans fats may contain up to 15% trans fat by weight, but some reformulated ones are less than 1% trans fat. Shortenings for deep-frying in restaurants can be used for longer than most conventional oils before becoming rancid. In the early 21st century, non-hydrogenated vegetable oils that have lifespans exceeding that of the frying shortenings became available.

Trans fat contents in various natural and traditionally processed foods, in g per 100 g
Food type	Trans fat content
butter	2 to 7 g
whole milk	0.07 to 0.1 g
animal fat	0 to 5 g
ground beef	1 g

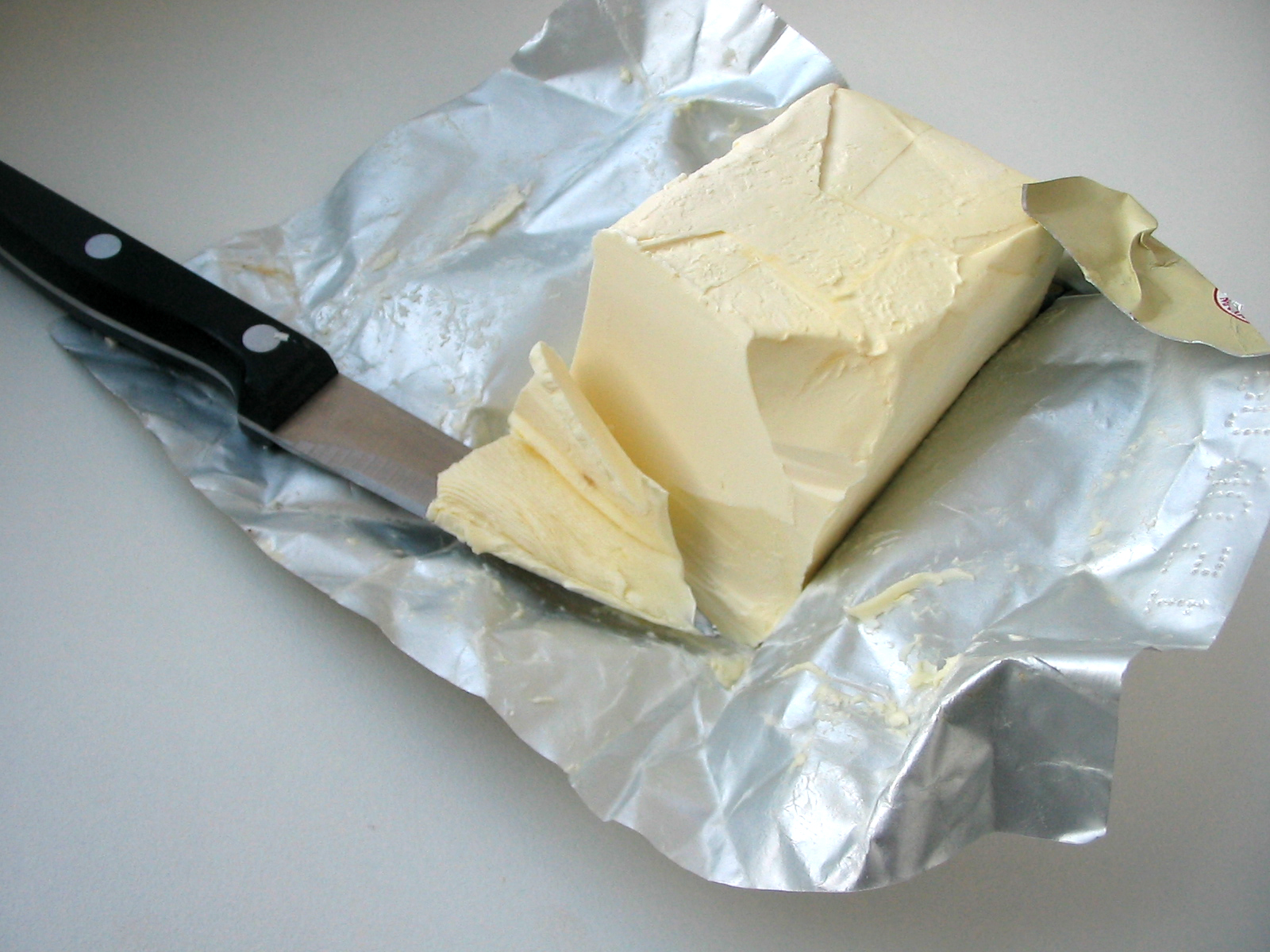
Margarine, a common product that can contain trans fatty acids

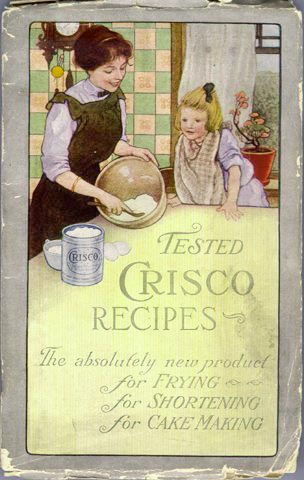
Cover of original Crisco cookbook, 1912. Crisco was made by hydrogenating cottonseed oil. The formula was revised in the 2000s and now has only a small amount of trans fat.

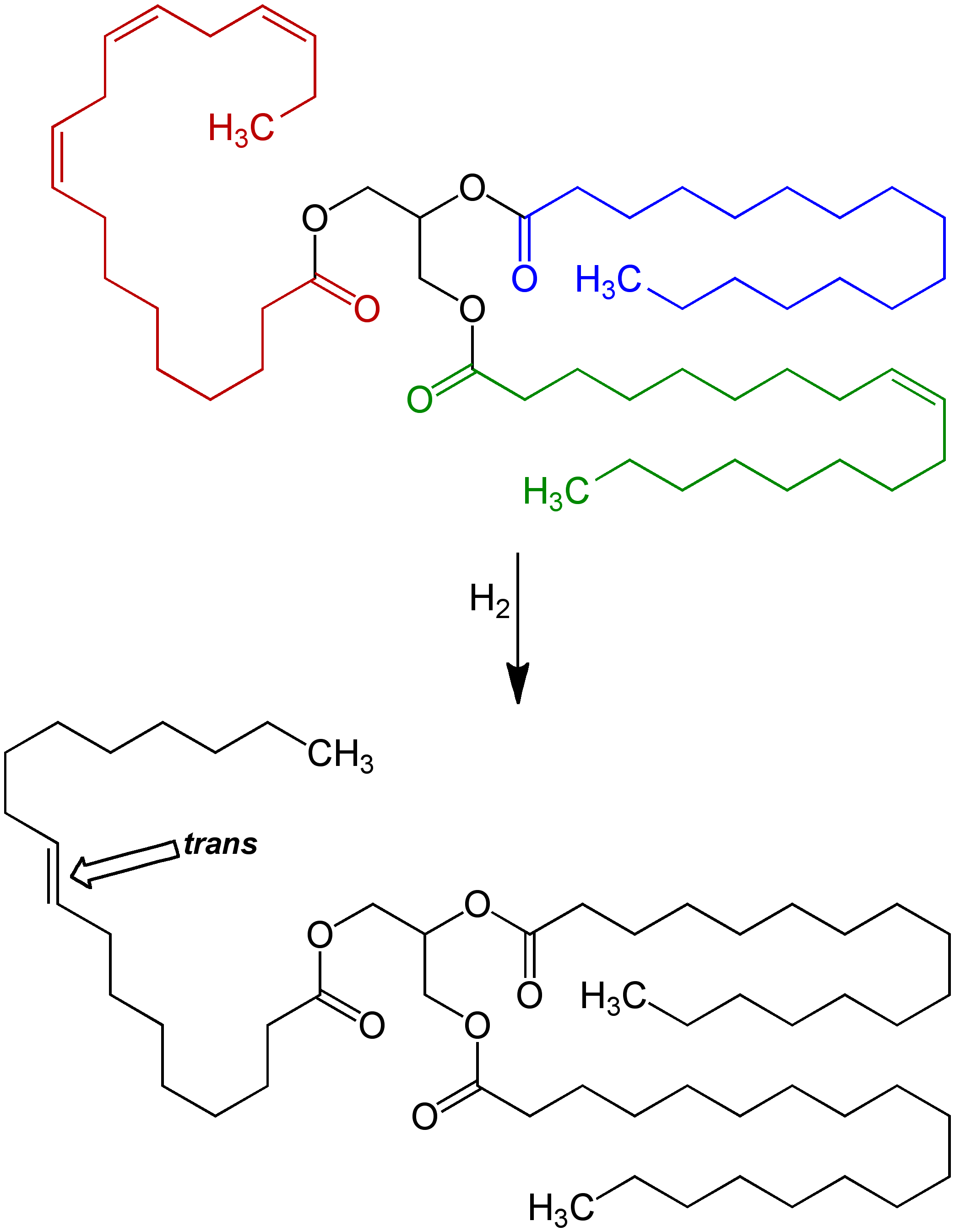
Conversion of cis to trans fatty acids in partial hydrogenation

High levels of TFAs have been recorded in popular "fast food" meals. In fast-food chains, trans fat levels can vary with location. An analysis of samples of McDonald's French fries collected in 2004 and 2005 found that fries served in New York City contained twice as much trans fat as in Hungary, and 28 times as much as in Denmark, where trans fats are restricted. For Kentucky Fried Chicken products, the pattern was reversed: the Hungarian product containing twice the trans fat of the New York product. Even within the United States, there was variation, with fries in New York containing 30% more trans fat than those from Atlanta.

=== Breast milk ===
It has been established that trans fats in human breast milk fluctuate with maternal consumption of trans fat, and that the amount of trans fats in the bloodstream of breastfed infants fluctuates with the amounts found in their milk. In 1999, reported percentages of trans fats (compared to total fats) in human milk ranged from 1% in Spain, 2% in France, 4% in Germany, and 7% in Canada and the U.S.

== Regulatory action ==
In the last few decades, there has been substantial amount of regulation in many countries, limiting trans fat contents of industrialized and commercial food products.

In light of recognized evidence and scientific agreement, nutritional authorities consider all trans fats equally harmful for health and recommend that their consumption be reduced to trace amounts. In 2003, the WHO recommended that trans fats make up no more than 0.9% of a person's diet and, in 2018, introduced a 6-step guide to eliminate industrially produced trans-fatty acids from the global food supply.

The National Academy of Sciences (NAS) advises the U.S. and Canadian governments on nutritional science for use in public policy and product labeling programs. Their 2002 Dietary Reference Intakes for Energy, Carbohydrate, Fiber, Fat, Fatty Acids, Cholesterol, Protein, and Amino Acids contains their findings and recommendations regarding consumption of trans fat.

Their recommendations are based on two key facts. First, "trans fatty acids are not essential and provide no known benefit to human health", whether of animal or plant origin. Second, given their documented effects on the LDL/HDL ratio, the NAS concluded "that dietary trans fatty acids are more deleterious with respect to coronary artery disease than saturated fatty acids". A 2006 review stated "from a nutritional standpoint, the consumption of trans fatty acids results in considerable potential harm but no apparent benefit."

Because of these facts and concerns, the NAS has concluded there is no safe level of trans fat consumption. There is no adequate level, recommended daily amount or tolerable upper limit for trans fats. This is because any incremental increase in trans fat intake increases the risk of coronary artery disease.

Despite this concern, the NAS dietary recommendations have not included eliminating trans fat from the diet. This is because trans fat is naturally present in many animal foods in trace quantities, and thus its removal from ordinary diets might introduce undesirable side effects and nutritional imbalances. The NAS has, thus, "recommended that trans fatty acid consumption be as low as possible while consuming a nutritionally adequate diet". Like the NAS, the WHO has tried to balance public health goals with a practical level of trans fat consumption, recommending in 2003 that trans fats be limited to less than 1% of overall energy intake.

== Health effects ==
=== Cardiovascular disease ===
The primary health risk identified for trans fat consumption is an elevated risk of coronary artery disease (CAD). A 1994 study estimated that over 30,000 cardiac deaths per year in the United States are attributable to the consumption of trans fats. By 2006 upper estimates of 100,000 deaths were suggested.

Major evidence for the effect of trans fat on CAD comes from the Nurses' Health Study – a cohort study that has been following 120,000 female nurses since its inception in 1976. In this study, Hu and colleagues analyzed data from 900 coronary events from the study's population during 14 years of followup. He determined that a nurse's CAD risk roughly doubled (relative risk of 1.93, CI: 1.43 to 2.61) for each 2% increase in trans fat calories consumed (instead of carbohydrate calories). By contrast, for each 5% increase in saturated fat calories (instead of carbohydrate calories) there was a 17% increase in risk (relative risk of 1.17, CI: 0.97 to 1.41). "The replacement of saturated fat or trans unsaturated fat by cis (unhydrogenated) unsaturated fats was associated with larger reductions in risk than an isocaloric replacement by carbohydrates." Hu also reports on the benefits of reducing trans fat consumption. Replacing 2% of food energy from trans fat with non-trans unsaturated fats more than halves the risk of CAD (53%). By comparison, replacing a larger 5% of food energy from saturated fat with non-trans unsaturated fats reduces the risk of CAD by 43%.

Another study considered deaths due to CAD, with consumption of trans fats being linked to an increase in mortality, and consumption of polyunsaturated fats being linked to a decrease in mortality.

==== Biomarkers ====
Consuming trans fats has been shown to increase the risk of coronary artery disease in part by raising levels of low-density lipoprotein (LDL, often termed "bad cholesterol"), lowering levels of high-density lipoprotein (HDL, often termed "good cholesterol"), increasing triglycerides in the bloodstream and promoting systemic inflammation.

Trans fat has been found to act like saturated in raising the blood level of LDL ("bad cholesterol"); but, unlike saturated fat, it also decreases levels of HDL ("good cholesterol"). The net increase in LDL/HDL ratio with trans fat, a widely accepted indicator of risk for coronary artery disease, is approximately double that due to saturated fat. One randomized crossover study published in 2003 comparing the effect of eating a meal on blood lipids of (relatively) cis and trans-fat-rich meals showed that cholesteryl ester transfer (CET) was 28% higher after the trans meal than after the cis meal and that lipoprotein concentrations were enriched in apolipoprotein(a) after the trans meals.

The cytokine test is a potentially more reliable indicator of CAD risk, although is still being studied. A study of over 700 nurses showed that those in the highest quartile of trans fat consumption had blood levels of C-reactive protein (CRP) that were 73% higher than those in the lowest quartile.

Intake of dietary trans fat perturbs the body's ability to metabolize essential fatty acids (EFAs, including omega-3) leading to changes in the phospholipid fatty acid composition of the arterial walls, thereby raising risk of coronary artery disease.

There are two accepted tests that measure an individual's risk for coronary artery disease, both blood tests. The first considers ratios of two types of cholesterol, the other the amount of a cell-signalling cytokine called C-reactive protein. The effect of trans fat consumption has been documented on each as follows:

- Cholesterol ratio: This ratio compares the levels of LDL to HDL. Trans fat behaves like saturated fat by raising the level of LDL, but, unlike saturated fat, it has the additional effect of decreasing levels of HDL. The net increase in LDL/HDL ratio with trans fat is approximately double that due to saturated fat. (Higher ratios are worse.) One randomized crossover study published in 2003 comparing the effect of eating a meal on blood lipids of (relatively) cis and trans fat rich meals showed that cholesteryl ester transfer (CET) was 28% higher after the trans meal than after the cis meal and that lipoprotein concentrations were enriched in apolipoprotein(a) after the trans meals.
- C-reactive protein (CRP): A study of over 700 nurses showed that those in the highest quartile of trans fat consumption had blood levels of CRP that were 73% higher than those in the lowest quartile.

=== Biochemical mechanisms ===
The mechanisms through which trans fatty acids contribute to coronary artery disease are fairly well understood. The mechanism for their effects on diabetes is still under investigation. They may impair the metabolism of long-chain polyunsaturated fatty acids (LCPUFAs). However, maternal pregnancy trans fatty acid intake has been inversely associated with LCPUFAs levels in infants at birth thought to underlie the positive association between breastfeeding and intelligence.

Trans fats are processed by the liver differently than other fats. They may cause liver dysfunction by interfering with delta 6 desaturase, an enzyme involved in converting essential fatty acids to arachidonic acid and prostaglandins, both of which are important to the functioning of cells.

Intake of dietary trans fat disrupts the body's ability to metabolize essential fatty acids (EFAs, including Omega-3) leading to changes in the phospholipid fatty acid composition of the arterial walls, thereby raising risk of coronary artery disease.

Another study considered deaths due to CAD, with consumption of trans fats being linked to an increase in mortality, and consumption of polyunsaturated fats being linked to a decrease in mortality.

=== Other health risks ===
Scientific studies have examined other negative effects of industrial trans fat beyond cardiovascular disease, with the next most studied area being type-2 diabetes.

- Alzheimer's disease: A study published in Archives of Neurology in February 2003 suggested that the intake of both trans fats and saturated fats promote the development of Alzheimer disease, although not confirmed in an animal model. It has been found that trans fats impaired memory and learning in middle-age rats. The trans-fat eating rats' brains had fewer proteins critical to healthy neurological function and inflammation in and around the hippocampus, the part of the brain responsible for learning and memory. These are the exact types of changes normally seen at the onset of Alzheimer's, but seen after six weeks, even though the rats were still young. A systematic review of five articles based on four prospective cohort studies of individuals did not find a robust association between their intake of trans fatty acids and development of Alzheimer's disease (or several other forms of dementia). The review based this conclusion on finding that 4 of the 5 reports appeared biased and therefore recommended more well-designed prospective studies to clarify this issue.
- Cancer: In 2007 the American Cancer Society stated that a relationship between trans fats and cancer "has not been determined." One study has found a positive connection between trans fat and prostate cancer. However, a larger study found a correlation between trans fats and a significant decrease in high-grade prostate cancer. An increased intake of trans fatty acids may raise the risk of breast cancer by 75%, suggest the results from the French part of the European Prospective Investigation into Cancer and Nutrition.
- Diabetes: There is a growing concern that the risk of type 2 diabetes increases with trans fat consumption. However, consensus has not been reached. For example, one study found that risk is higher for those in the highest quartile of trans fat consumption. Another study has found no diabetes risk once other factors such as total fat intake and BMI were accounted for.
- Obesity: Research indicates that trans fat may increase weight gain and abdominal fat, despite a similar caloric intake. A 6-year experiment revealed that monkeys fed a trans fat diet gained 7.2% of their body weight, as compared to 1.8% for monkeys on a mono-unsaturated fat diet. Although obesity is frequently linked to trans fat in the popular media, this is generally in the context of eating too many calories; there is not a strong scientific consensus connecting trans fat and obesity, although the 6-year experiment did find such a link, concluding that "under controlled feeding conditions, long-term TFA consumption was an independent factor in weight gain. TFAs enhanced intra-abdominal deposition of fat, even in the absence of caloric excess, and were associated with insulin resistance, with evidence that there is impaired post-insulin receptor binding signal transduction."
- Liver dysfunction: Trans fats are metabolized differently by the liver than other fats and interfere with delta 6 desaturase. Delta 6 desaturase is an enzyme involved in converting essential fatty acids to arachidonic acid and prostaglandins, both of which are important to the functioning of cells.
- Infertility in women: One 2007 study found, "Each 2% increase in the intake of energy from trans unsaturated fats, as opposed to that from carbohydrates, was associated with a 73% greater risk of ovulatory infertility...".
- Major depressive disorder: Spanish researchers analysed the diets of 12,059 people over six years and found that those who ate the most trans fats had a 48 per cent higher risk of depression than those who did not eat trans fats. One mechanism may be trans-fats' substitution for docosahexaenoic acid (DHA) levels in the orbitofrontal cortex (OFC). Very high intake of trans-fatty acids (43% of total fat) in mice from 2 to 16 months of age was associated with lowered DHA levels in the brain (p=0.001). When the brains of 15 major depressive subjects who had committed suicide were examined post-mortem and compared against 27 age-matched controls, the suicidal brains were found to have 16% less (male average) to 32% less (female average) DHA in the OFC. The OFC controls reward, reward expectation, and empathy (all of which are reduced in depressive mood disorders) and regulates the limbic system.
- Behavioral irritability and aggression: a 2012 observational analysis of subjects of an earlier study found a strong relation between dietary trans fat acids and self-reported behavioral aggression and irritability, suggesting but not establishing causality.
- Diminished memory: In a 2015 article, researchers re-analyzing results from the 1999–2005 UCSD Statin Study argue that "greater dietary trans fatty acid consumption is linked to worse word memory in adults during years of high productivity."
- Acne: According to a 2015 study, trans fats are one of several components of Western pattern diets which promote acne, along with carbohydrates with high glycemic load such as refined sugars or refined starches, milk and dairy products, and saturated fats, while omega-3 fatty acids, which reduce acne, are deficient in Western pattern diets.

== Food industry response ==
=== Manufacturer response ===
Palm oil, a natural oil extracted from the fruit of oil palm trees that is semi-solid at room temperature (15–25 degrees Celsius), can potentially serve as a substitute for partially hydrogenated fats in baking and processed food applications, although there is disagreement about whether replacing partially hydrogenated fats with palm oil confers any health benefits. A 2006 study supported by the National Institutes of Health and the USDA Agricultural Research Service concluded that palm oil is not a safe substitute for partially hydrogenated fats (trans fats) in the food industry, because palm oil results in adverse changes in the blood concentrations of LDL and apolipoprotein B just as trans fat does.

In May 2003, BanTransFats.com Inc., a U.S. non-profit corporation, filed a lawsuit against the food manufacturer Kraft Foods in an attempt to force Kraft to remove trans fats from the Oreo cookie. The lawsuit was withdrawn when Kraft agreed to work on ways to find a substitute for the trans fat in the Oreo.

The J.M. Smucker Company, then the American manufacturer of Crisco (the original partially hydrogenated vegetable shortening), in 2004 released a new formulation made from solid saturated palm oil cut with soybean oil and sunflower oil. This blend yielded an equivalent shortening much like the prior partially hydrogenated Crisco, and was labelled zero grams of trans fat per 1 tablespoon serving (as compared with 1.5 grams per tablespoon of original Crisco). As of 24 January 2007, Smucker said that all Crisco shortening products in the US had been reformulated to contain less than one gram of trans fat per serving while keeping saturated fat content less than butter. The separately marketed trans fat free version introduced in 2004 was discontinued.

On 22 May 2004, Unilever, the corporate descendant of Joseph Crosfield & Sons (the original producer of Wilhelm Normann's hydrogenation hardened oils) announced that they had eliminated trans fats from all their margarine products in Canada, including their flagship Becel brand.

Agribusiness giant Bunge Limited, through their Bunge Oils division, produce an NT product line of non-hydrogenated oils, margarines and shortenings, made from corn, canola, and soy oils.

=== Major users' response ===
Beginning around 2000, as the scientific evidence and public concern about trans fat increased, major American users of trans fat began to switch to safer alternatives. The process received a large boost in 2003 when the FDA announced it would require trans fat labeling on packaged food starting in 2006. Packaged food companies then faced the choice of either eliminating trans fat from their products, or having to declare the trans fat on their nutrition label. Lawsuits in the U.S. against trans fat users also encouraged its removal.

Major American fast food chains including McDonald's, Burger King, KFC and Wendy's reduced and then removed partially hydrogenated oils (containing artificial trans fats) by 2009. This was a major step toward trans fat removal, as french fries were one of the largest sources of trans fat in the American diet, with a large serving of fries typically having about 6 grams of trans fat until around 2007.

Two other events were important in the removal of trans fat. First, in 2013 the FDA announced it planned to completely ban artificial trans fat in the form of partially hydrogenated oil. Second, soon after this, Walmart informed its suppliers they needed to remove trans fat by 2015 if they wanted to continue to sell their products at its stores. As Walmart is the largest brick-and-mortar retailer in the U.S., mainstream food brands had little choice but to comply.

These reformulations can be partly attributed to 2006 Center for Science in the Public Interest class action complaints, and to New York's restaurant trans fat ban, a massive effort led by Minal Amlani under the guidance of Michael Bloomberg, with companies such as McDonald's stating they would not be selling a unique product just for New York customers but would implement a nationwide or worldwide change.

== See also ==
- Diet and heart disease
- Health crisis
- Interesterified fat
- Hydrogenated fat
- Margarine
