= Conjugated fatty acid =

Class of fatty acids

Chemical structure of the conjugated fatty acid rumenic acid, an isomer of conjugated linoleic acid

Conjugated fatty acids is jargon for polyunsaturated fatty acids containing at least one pair of conjugated double bonds. An example of a conjugated fatty acid is the rumenic acid, found in the meat and milk of ruminants. Most unsaturated fatty acids that are doubly unsaturated do not feature conjugation, e.g., linoleic acid and linoelaidic acid.

Some conjugated fatty acids may confer health benefits ranging from the prevention of hypertension to protection against certain forms of cancer, although more research is needed to confirm such effects. Clinical studies and animal models have shown that conjugated fatty acids confer physiological benefits such as the regulation of the synthesis and breakdown of lipids, reduction of inflammation, and antioxidant properties.

Some conjugated fatty acids feature trans alkenes. For instance, the rumenic acid (cis-9, trans-11) is a conjugated trans fatty acid. Conjugated trans fatty acids are exempt from trans fat labeling in the United States.

The most investigated conjugated fatty acids are conjugated analogues (isomers) of linoleic acid, called conjugated linoleic acids (CLA). Studies have suggested that CLAs can modulate inflammatory responses in the body. However, CLA's anti-inflammatory properties correlate to isomer dependence. For instance, (cis-9, trans-11) CLA has been shown to have a decreased inflammatory effect on adipose tissues of mice with obesity-causing genes, while (trans-10, cis-12) CLA reduces obesity in mice without affecting insulin resistance or adipose tissue inflammation.

== See also ==
- Polyunsaturated fatty acids
