= Crisco =

American shortening brand

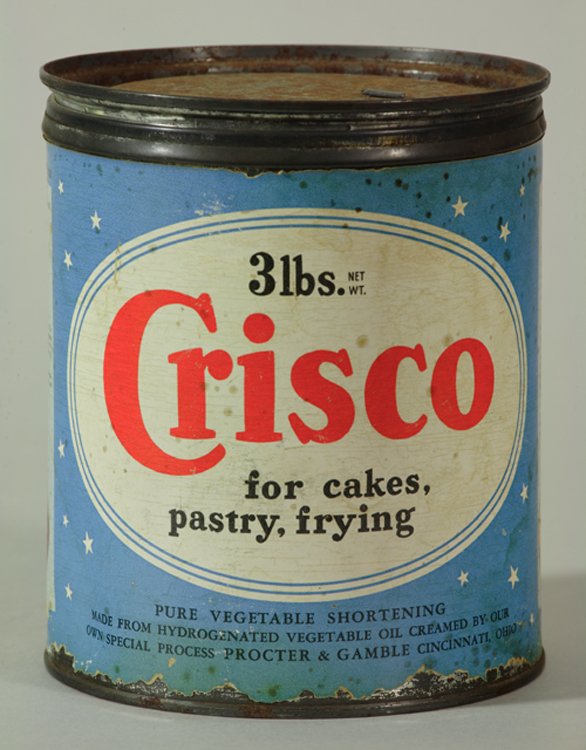
- Vintage Crisco can
- Product type: Shortening; Cooking spray; Cooking oils
- Current owner: B&G Foods
- Country: United States
- Introduced: June 1911; 115 years ago
- Previous owners: Procter & Gamble (1911–2002); The J.M. Smucker Company (2002–2020)
- Website: crisco.com

Crisco (/ˈkrɪs.koʊ/, KRIS-koh) is an American brand of shortening that is produced by B&G Foods in St. Bernard, Ohio. Introduced in June 1911 by Procter & Gamble, it was the first shortening to be made entirely of vegetable oil, originally cottonseed oil. Additional products marketed under the Crisco brand include a cooking spray, various olive oils, and other cooking oils, including canola, corn, peanut, sunflower, and blended oils.

== History ==
The process of the hydrogenation of organic substances in gas form was developed by Paul Sabatier in the late 19th century. Building on James Boyce's 1890s work in the successful development of a consumable solid lard substitute, Cottolene, in the U.S., the liquid form of hydrogenation was perfected and patented by Wilhelm Normann in 1903.

Joseph Crosfield and Sons acquired Normann's patent ostensibly for use in the production of soap. Their chief chemist, Edwin C. Kayser, was hired by Procter & Gamble's business manager, John Burchenal, and they patented two processes to hydrogenate cottonseed oil. Although their initial intent was to completely harden oils for use as raw material for making soap, these processes ensured that the fat would remain solid at normal storage temperatures and could find use in the food industry.

After rejecting the names "Krispo" and "Cryst" (the latter for its religious connotations), Procter & Gamble called the product Crisco, a modification of the phrase "crystallized cottonseed oil". They used advertising techniques that encouraged consumers not to be concerned about ingredients but to trust in a reliable brand. Further success came from the marketing technique of giving away free cookbooks in which every recipe called for Crisco.

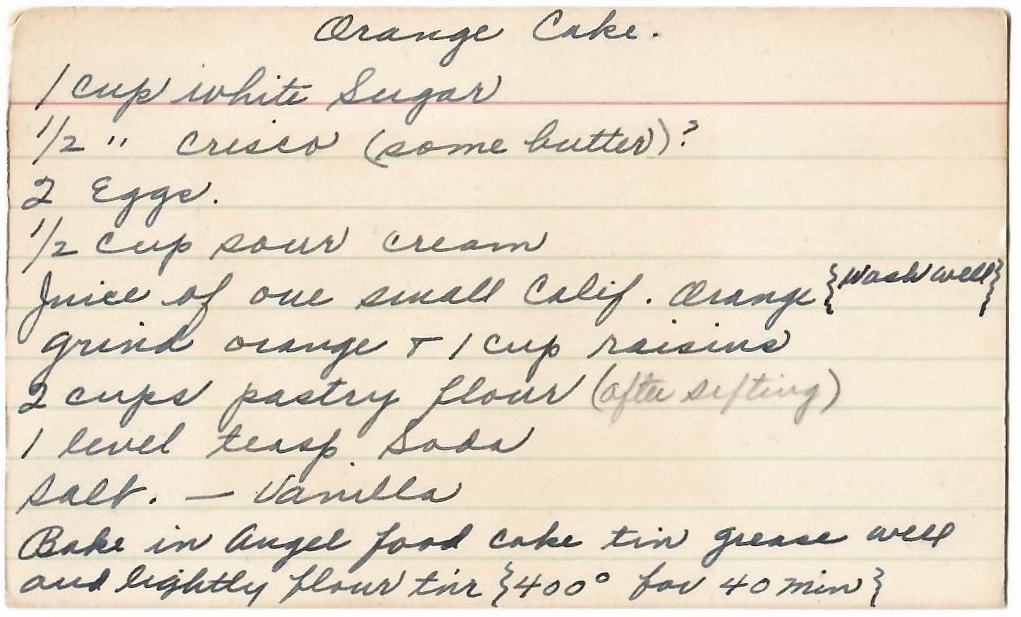
By the mid-20th-century, home cooks often substituted Crisco for butter in baked goods, as was the case in this orange cake recipe

Crisco vegetable oil was introduced in 1960. In 1976, Procter & Gamble introduced sunflower oil under the trade name Puritan Oil, which was marketed as a lower-cholesterol alternative. In 1988, Puritan Oil was switched to 100% canola oil.

In 2002, Procter & Gamble divested the Crisco (oil and shortening) brand, along with Jif peanut butter, in a spinoff to their stockholders; the two brands then immediately merged with the J. M. Smucker Co.

B&G Foods acquired the Crisco brand in December 2020.

== Changes in fat content ==
In April 2004, Smucker introduced "Crisco Zero Grams Trans Fat Per Serving All-Vegetable Shortening", which contained fully hydrogenated palm oil blended with liquid vegetable oils to yield a shortening much like the original Crisco. From January 24, 2007, all Crisco shortening products were reformulated to contain less than one gram of trans fat per serving; the separately marketed trans fat-free version introduced in 2004 was consequently discontinued. As of October 2022, Crisco consists of a blend of soybean oil, fully hydrogenated palm oil, and palm oil. According to the product information label, one 12-g serving of Crisco contains 3.5 g of saturated fat, 0 g of trans fat, 6 g of polyunsaturated fat, and 2.5 g of monounsaturated fat. This reformulated Crisco is claimed to have the same cooking properties and flavor as the original version of the product.

According to the FDA, "Food manufacturers are allowed to list amounts of trans fat with less than 0.5 gram (1/2 g) per serving as 0 (zero) on the Nutrition Facts panel."

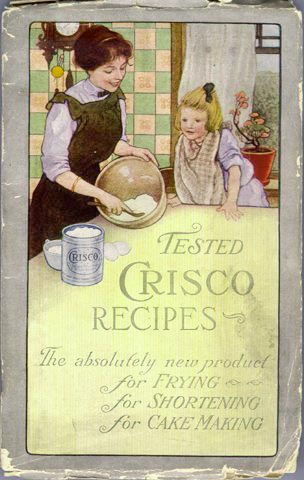
Cover of the original Crisco cookbook, 1912

Some nutritionists argue that while the formula has been changed to remove the trans fatty acids, the fully hydrogenated oil used to replace them may not be good for health. Crisco and similar low-trans fat products are formed by the interesterification of a mixture of fully hydrogenated oils and partially hydrogenated oils. The composition of the resultant triglycerides is random, and may contain combinations of fatty acids not commonly found in nature. A recent study showed that interesterified fat increased volunteers' blood sugar by 20%, while simultaneously lowering the body's HDL cholesterol.

== Kream Krisp ==
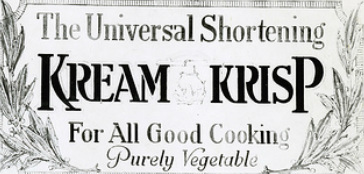
Kream Krisp logo

While Kayser's patents were filed in 1910 and granted in 1915, Hugh Moore, chief chemist for the Berlin Mills Company in Berlin, New Hampshire, filed his patents by 1914 (granted 1914 and 1916). Berlin Mills's vegetable shortening (later trademarked in 1915 as Kream Krisp) appeared on the market in 1914. Procter & Gamble became aware of the competition by February 1915. Burchenal contacted Berlin Mills claiming that they were infringing on P&G's patents and suggested they meet to discuss the issue. When this approach failed, P&G filed suit against Berlin Mills (see Berlin Mills Co. v. Procter & Gamble Co., 254 U.S. 156 (1920), also known as Procter and Gamble vs. the Brown Company). (Note: In 1917 the Berlin Mills Co. became the Brown Company.) Procter and Gamble lost the suit, but they bought Kream Krisp in the mid-1920s.

== Sexual use ==
Around the time of the gay liberation movement of the 1960s–1980s, men commonly used Crisco as a lubricant for anal fisting since it was inexpensive and widely available. It was prominently featured in gay pornography such as Erotic Hands (1980) before specialized products became available. As a result, "Crisco" became a euphemism for fisting in gay slang.

According to Drew Sawyer, a Ph.D. student who presented commentary on art history in a 2007 "Thing Theory" seminar class at Columbia University, in the 1970s, cans of Crisco were "so synonymous with gay sex that discos and bars around the world took on the name, such as Crisco Disco in New York City, one of the premiere clubs during the 1970s and early 1980s". The DJ booth at Crisco Disco was designed to resemble a giant Crisco can.

== In popular culture ==
In 2013, Detroit-based artist Jerry Vile placed a 4-ft. tall empty can decorated to look like a can of Crisco in front of the fist-shaped Monument to Joe Louis for "helping to ease the pain of Detroit's bankruptcy." Many interpreted the can as a reference to the sexual practice of fisting.

Crisco is also mentioned in Nirvana's Hairspray Queen: "where he is quoted in the line "At night, Crisco lovefest." They also played around with oil alongside The Smashing Pumpkins.
