= Crisco Disco =

New York City Night Club

- Interactive map of Crisco Disco
- Address: 408 West 15th Street; New York City; United States
- Coordinates: 40.7418°N 74.0058°W
- Type: Nightclub

The Crisco Disco was a New York City discotheque notable in the history of modern dance, LGBT and nightclub cultures. The venue was an important gay club located in the Chelsea neighborhood of Manhattan at 15th Street and 10th Avenue.

It operated from the 1970s to the 1980s during the disco era, and it has been compared in importance to other NYC clubs such as Paradise Garage. In 2015, Michael Musto listed Crisco Disco as one of the eight "...edgiest [NYC venues] that shall never be recaptured." The club had a large DJ booth where DJs would mix records for the dancers. As a DJ booth, the club constructed a giant, mock vintage can of Crisco shortening.

Around the time of the gay liberation movement, men commonly used Crisco as a lubricant for anal fisting since it was inexpensive and widely available. It was prominently featured in gay pornography such as Erotic Hands (1980) before specialized products became available. As a result, "Crisco" became a euphemism for fisting in gay slang. According to Drew Sawyer, in the 1970s, cans of Crisco were "so synonymous with gay sex that discos and bars around the world took on the name, such as Crisco Disco in New York City, one of the premiere clubs during the 1970s and early 1980s."

A 1998 book entitled Gay Macho: The Life and Death of the Homosexual Clone states that "many circuit bars, discos, and sex clubs had names that evoked sexual experience", including "Cockring, a popular nonmembership dance club". Bill Brewster's history of DJ culture states that in New York City clubs such as Crisco Disco, Mineshaft and Anvil, "dancing took second place to sex".

In his 2019 autobiography Me, Elton John recounts that in the 1970s, he and the drag performer Divine were once denied entry to Crisco Disco because they were too outrageously dressed.

== See also ==
- LGBT culture in New York City
