= Spry Vegetable Shortening =

Cooking oil

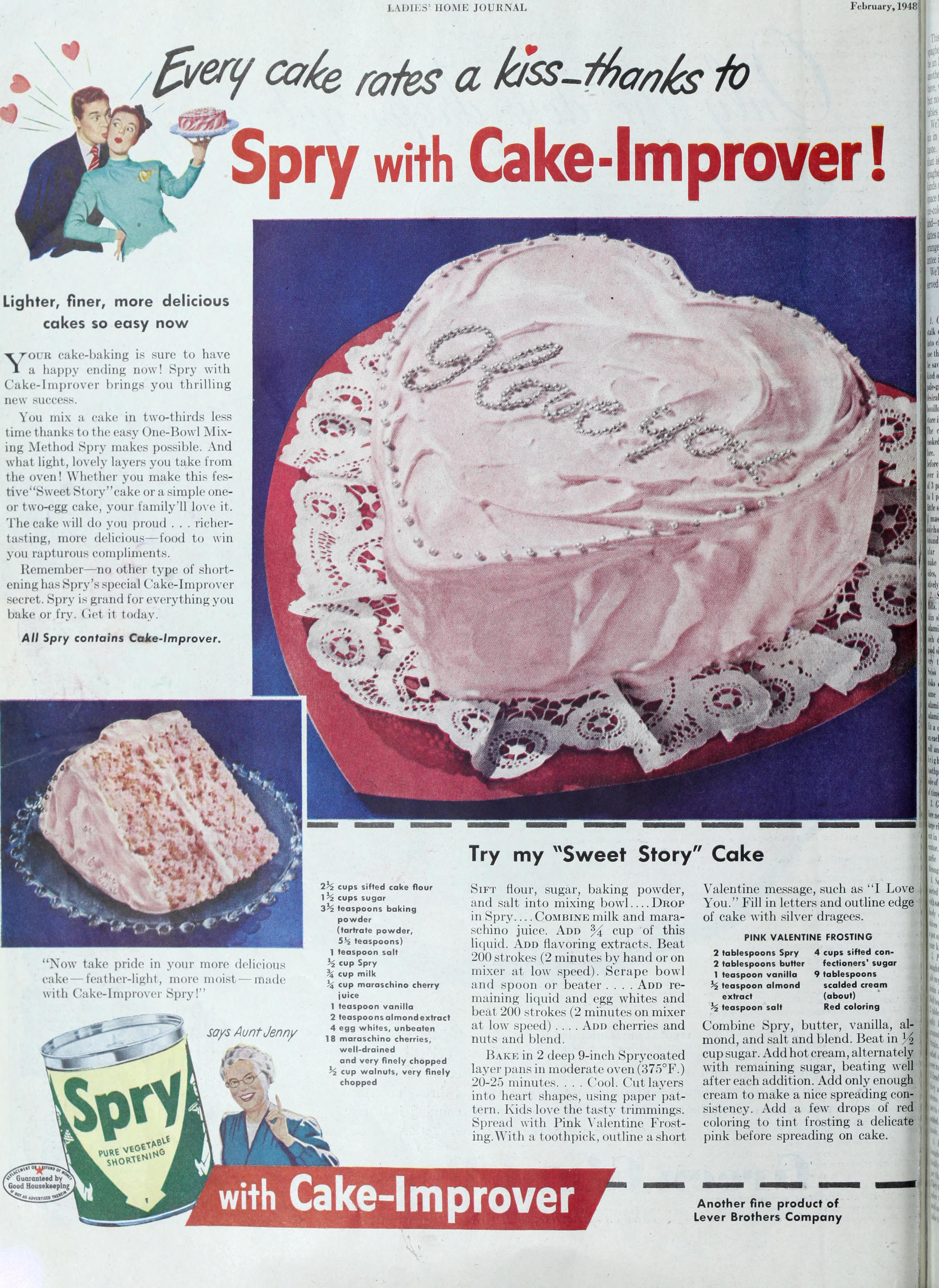

Spry was a brand of vegetable shortening produced by Lever Brothers starting in 1936. It was a competitor for Procter & Gamble's Crisco, and through aggressive marketing through its mascot Aunt Jenny had reached 75 percent of Crisco's market share. The marketing efforts were phased out in the 1950s, but Aunt Jenny and her quotes like With Spry, we can afford to have cake oftener! have been reprinted. Though the product is discontinued in most countries, there are anecdotal reports of its being used through the 1970s. It appears as an ingredient in "Hungarian Nut Cake" in the August 1975 booklet "Favorite Recipes of the Aetna Girls" [Toledo, Ohio office].

During its heyday in the 1950s, a large blinking sign advertising Spry on the New Jersey side of the Hudson River was a memorable part of the Manhattan evening skyline, mentioned several times in The New Yorker magazine and appearing at least once on its cover.

Spry Vegetable Shortening is still widely available in Cyprus as a Stork brand, where it is manufactured by Upfield Hellas (previously Ambrosia Oils for Unilever).

The related product, Spry Cooking Oil, was marketed in the UK throughout the 1970s with the slogan "Spry Crisp and Dry".
