= Shortening =

Food ingredient

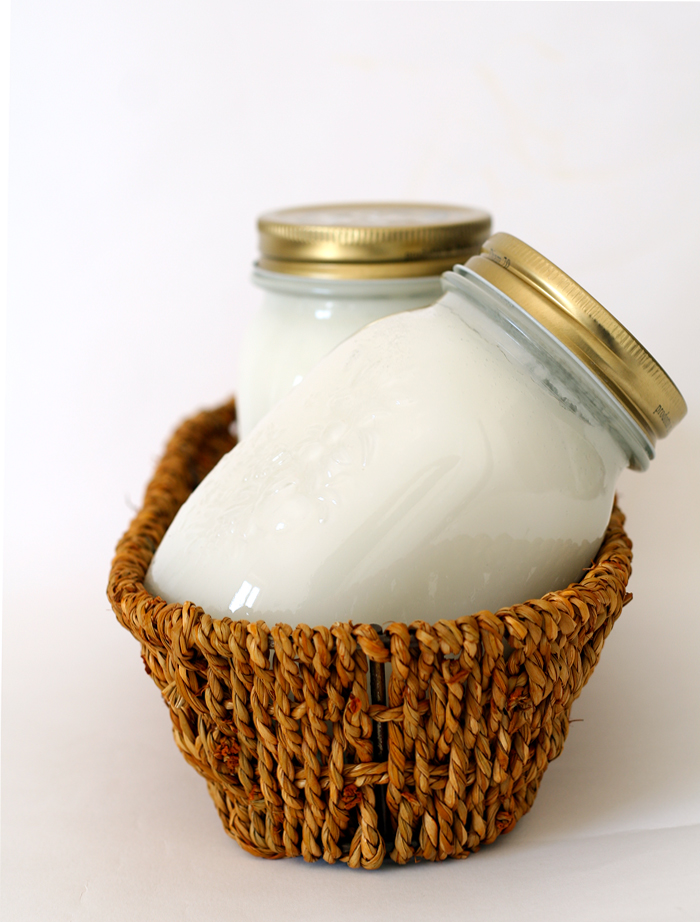
Strutto, clarified pork fat, or lard, a type of shortening common in Italy and Corsica (where it is named sdruttu)

Shortening is any fat that is a solid at room temperature and is used to make crumbly pastry and other food products.

The idea of shortening dates back to at least the 18th century, well before the invention of modern, shelf-stable vegetable shortening. In earlier centuries, lard was the primary ingredient used to shorten dough. The reason it is called shortening is that it makes the resulting food crumbly, or to behave as if it had short fibers. Solid fat prevents cross-linking between gluten molecules. This cross-linking would give dough elasticity, so it could be stretched into longer pieces. In pastries such as cake, which should not be elastic, shortening is used to produce the desired texture.

== History and market ==
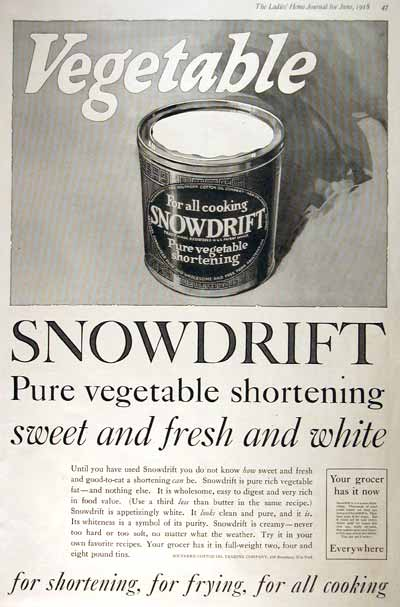
A 1918 advertisement for shortening

Originally shortening was synonymous with lard, but with the invention of margarine from beef tallow by French chemist Hippolyte Mège-Mouriès in 1869, margarine also came to be included in the term. Since the invention of hydrogenated vegetable oil in the early 20th century, "shortening" has come almost exclusively to mean hydrogenated vegetable oil.

Hydrogenation of organic substances was first developed by the French chemist Paul Sabatier in 1897, and in 1901 the German chemist Wilhelm Normann developed the hydrogenation of fats, which he patented in 1902. In 1907, a German chemist, Edwin Cuno Kayser, moved to Cincinnati, Ohio, the home town of soap manufacturer Procter & Gamble. He had worked for British soap manufacturer Joseph Crosfield and Sons and was well acquainted with Normann's process, as Crosfield and Sons owned the British rights to Normann's patent. Soon after arriving, Kayser made a business deal with Procter & Gamble, and presented the company with two processes to hydrogenate cottonseed oil, with the intent of creating a raw material for soap. Another inventor by the name of Wallace McCaw in Macon, Georgia also played a role in the invention of shortening. In 1905 McCaw patented a process in which he could turn inexpensive and commercially useless cottonseeds into imitation lard and soap. Later in 1909, Procter & Gamble hired McCaw and purchased his patents along with the patents of other scientists working on partial hydrogenation which later helped in the development of "shortening". Since the product looked like lard, Procter & Gamble instead began selling it as a vegetable fat for cooking purposes in June 1911, calling it "Crisco", a modification of the phrase "crystallized cottonseed oil".

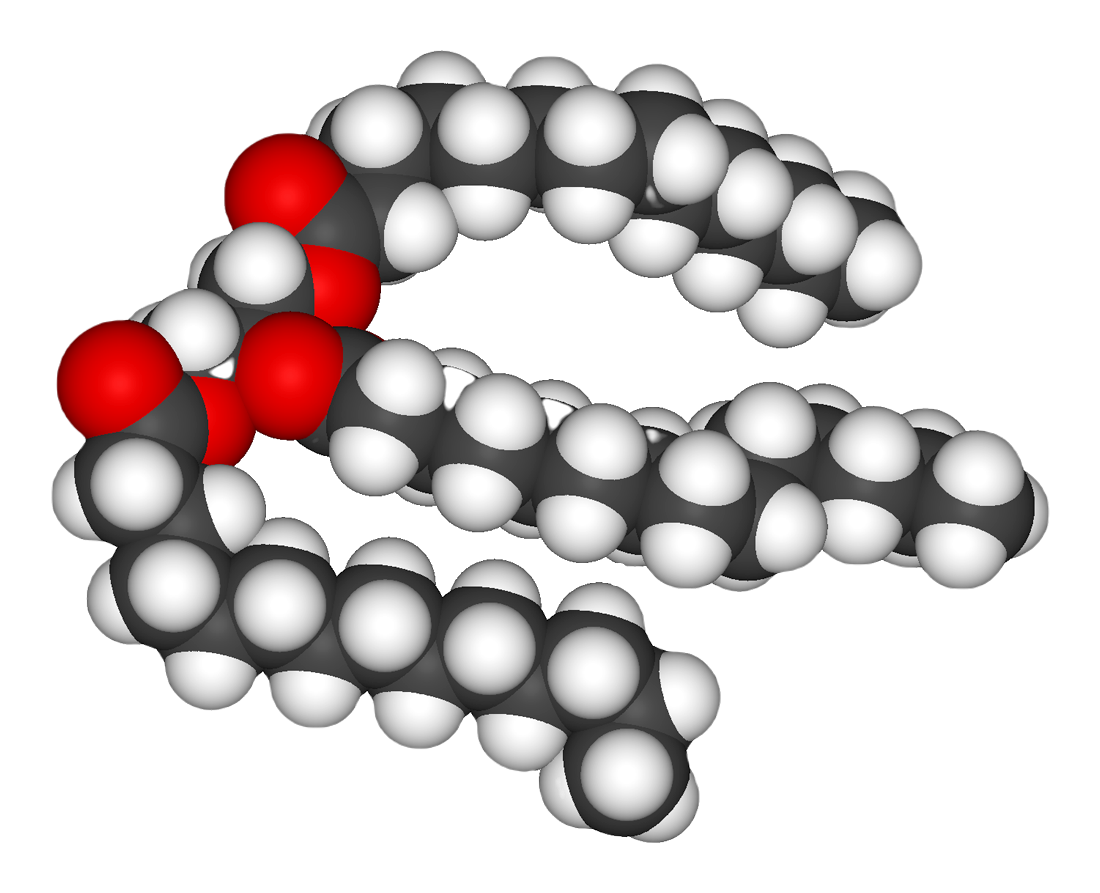
A triglyceride molecule, the main constituent of shortening

While similar to lard, vegetable shortening was much cheaper to produce. Shortening also required no refrigeration, which further lowered its costs and increased its appeal in a time when refrigerators were rare. Shortening was also more neutral in flavor than butter and lard which gave it a unique advantage when cooking. With these advantages, plus an intensive advertisement campaign by Procter & Gamble, Crisco quickly gained popularity in American households. The company targeted mothers by presenting shortening as a more economical and cleaner way of preparing meals. Procter & Gamble played into the neutral flavor of shortening as well as the high smoke point. As a result, they claimed that the natural flavors of the meal would shine through and be free of black particles and unruly smells common with other fats. Procter & Gamble also advertised how economical it was to use shortening, often advertising cheap recipes incorporating shortening to appeal to frugal mothers. As food production became increasingly industrialized and manufacturers sought low-cost raw materials, the use of vegetable shortening also became common in the food industry. In addition, in the US, government-financed surpluses of cottonseed oil, corn oil, and soybeans also helped lower the cost of vegetable shortening.

In the late 1990s, vegetable shortening became the subject of some health concerns due to partially hydrogenated vegetable oils containing trans fats, a type found only in small amounts in milk and some other natural foods. Trans fats have been linked to coronary artery disease and other adverse health effects. Beginning in 2004, the US shortening brand Crisco was first reformulated to contain less than one gram of trans fat per serving, and then, after the US FDA issued a 2018 ban on partially hydrogenated oils, to a trans-fat-free vegetable shortening made from fully hydrogenated palm oil and some soybean oils to improve the texture. Use of palm oil is controversial due to the environmental impact of commercial palm oil production, which is increased by clearing rainforests. In 2006, UK brand Cookeen was also reformulated to remove trans fats.

Crisco remains the best-known brand of shortening in the US, nowadays consisting of a blend of partially and fully hydrogenated soybean and palm oils. In the UK, Trex (rapeseed oil and palm oil) is the main one, while in Australia, Copha is popular, made primarily from coconut oil.

== Shortened dough ==
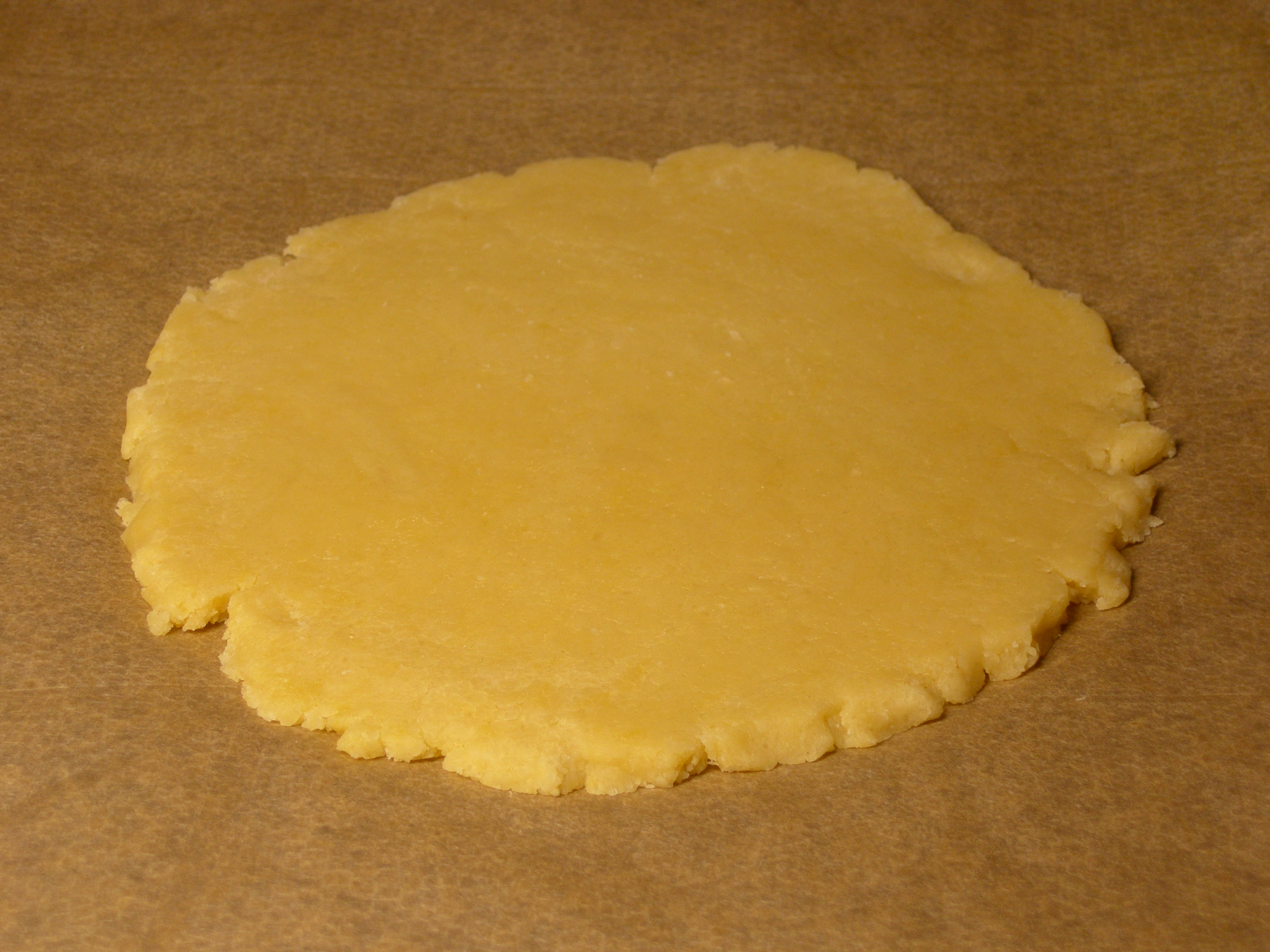
A short dough is crumbly; it will crack or crumble if stretched too far.

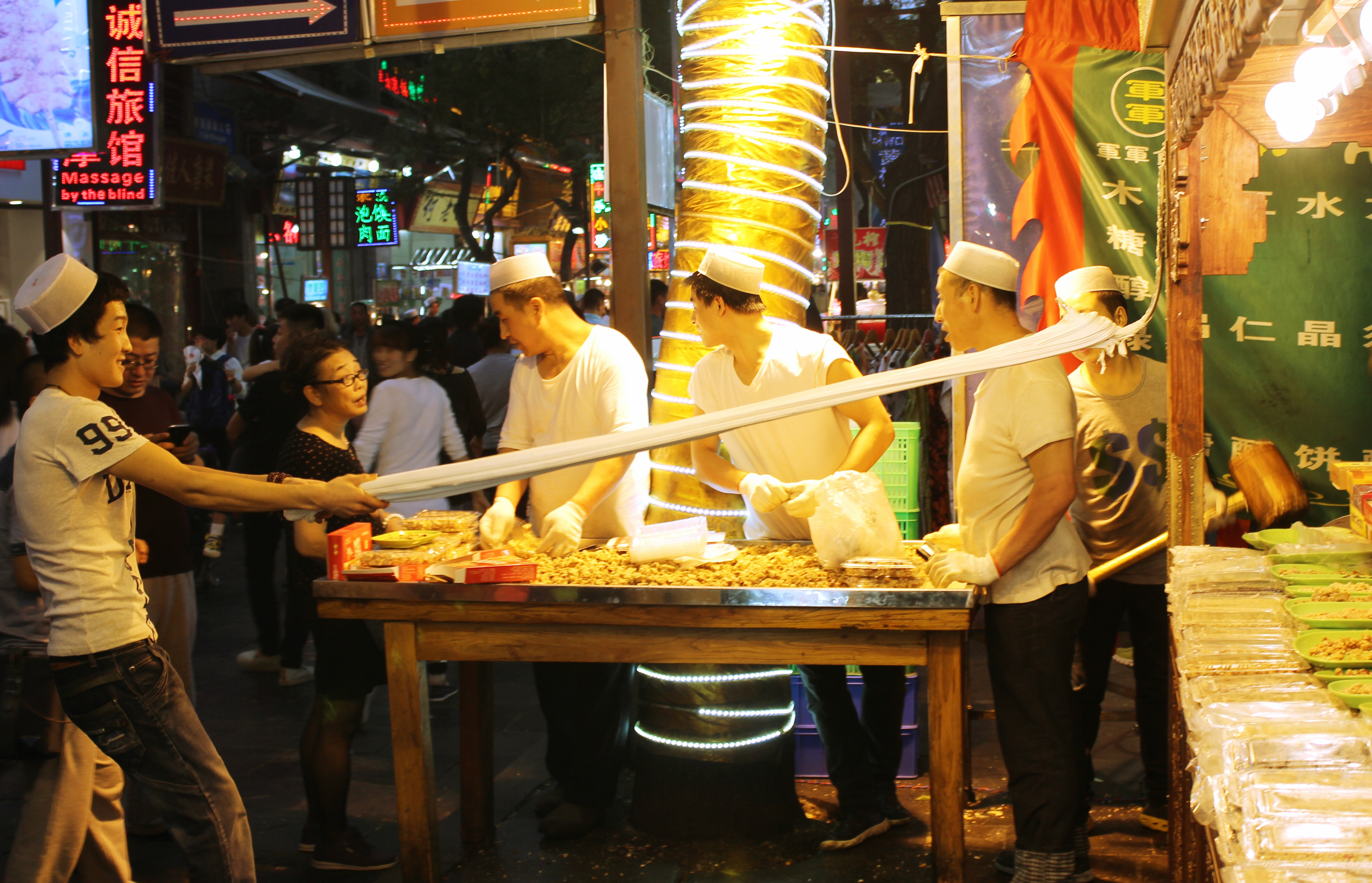
A long dough can be stretched easily.

A short dough, or shortened dough, is one that is crumbly or mealy. The opposite of a short dough is a long dough, one that stretches.

Vegetable shortening (or butter, or other solid fats) can produce both types of dough; the difference is in technique. To produce a short dough, which is commonly used for tarts, the shortening is cut into the flour with a food processor, a pastry blender, a pair of table knives, fingers, or other utensils until the resulting mixture has a fine, cornmeal-like texture. For a long dough, the shortening is cut in only until pea-sized crumbs are formed, or even larger lumps may be included. After cutting the fat in, the liquid (if any) is added and the dough is shaped for baking.

Neither short dough nor long flake dough are considered to be creamed or stirred batters.

== Types ==
In the most general sense, shortening is a hydrogenated fat, and it is used to make a short dough by mechanically reducing the length of fibers. Not everything that can shorten dough is necessarily called by the name of shortening. For example, butter and margarine can be used to shorten dough; however, these are not usually called shortening. Similarly, liquid shortening is a pourable liquid that most home cooks would not recognize as shortening.

In baking, different shortening products have different shortening power, or ability to affect a dough's composition. For example, lard has higher shortening power than butter, due to butter's water content. Similarly, melted vegetable shortening has a higher shortening power than the same vegetable shortening in solid form.

Modern margarine is made mainly of refined vegetable oil and water, and it may also contain milk.

Vegetable shortening shares many properties with lard: both are semi-solid fats with higher smoke points than butter and margarine. They contain less water and are thus less prone to splattering, making them safer for frying. Lard and vegetable shortening have higher fat contents, compared to about 80% for butter and margarine.

Specialized cake margarines and shortenings tend to contain a few percent of monoglycerides, whereas other margarines typically have less. Called emulsified shortenings or high-ratio shortenings, they blend better with hydrophilic ingredients, such as sugar. A high-ratio shortening is used in cake recipes whose ratio of sugar to flour (by weight) is higher.

== Nutritional information ==
Properties of common cooking fats (per 100 g)
Type of fat	Total fat (g)	Saturated fat (g)	Monounsaturated fat (g)	Polyunsaturated fat (g)	Smoke point
Butter	81	51	21	3	150 °C (302 °F)
Canola oil	100	6–7	62–64	24–26	205 °C (401 °F)
Coconut oil	99	83	6	2	177 °C (351 °F)
Corn oil	100	13–14	27–29	52–54	230 °C (446 °F)
Lard	100	39	45	11	190 °C (374 °F)
Peanut oil	100	16	57	20	225 °C (437 °F)
Olive oil	100	13–19	59–74	6–16	190 °C (374 °F)
Rice bran oil	100	25	38	37	250 °C (482 °F)
Soybean oil	100	15	22	57–58	257 °C (495 °F)
Suet	94	52	32	3	200 °C (392 °F)
Ghee	99	62	29	4	204 °C (399 °F)
Sunflower oil	100	10	20	66	225 °C (437 °F)
Sunflower oil (high oleic)	100	12	84	4	
Vegetable shortening	100	25	41	28	165 °C (329 °F)

== See also ==
- Butter
- Spread (food)

== Bibliography ==
- William Shurtleff and Akiko Aoyagi, 2007. History of Soy Oil Shortening: A Special Report on The History of Soy Oil, Soybean Meal, & Modern Soy Protein Products, from the unpublished manuscript, History of Soybeans and Soy foods: 1100 B.C. to the 1980s. Lafayette, California (US): Soyinfo Center.
