= Rumenic acid =

- Rumenic acid

Names
- Preferred IUPAC name (9Z,11E)-Octadeca-9,11-dienoic acid
- Other names Bovinic acid; C9-T11 acid

Identifiers
CAS Number	2540-56-9
3D model (JSmol)	Interactive image
ChEBI	CHEBI:32798
ChemSpider	4444245
KEGG	C04056
PubChem CID	5280644
UNII	46JZW3MR59
CompTox Dashboard (EPA)	DTXSID1041003
- InChI: InChI=1S/C18H32O2/c1-2-3-4-5-6-7-8-9-10-11-12-13-14-15-16-17-18(19)20/h7-10H,2-6,11-17H2,1H3,(H,19,20)/b8-7+,10-9- Key: JBYXPOFIGCOSSB-GOJKSUSPSA-N; InChI=1/C18H32O2/c1-2-3-4-5-6-7-8-9-10-11-12-13-14-15-16-17-18(19)20/h7-10H,2-6,11-17H2,1H3,(H,19,20)/b8-7+,10-9- Key: JBYXPOFIGCOSSB-GOJKSUSPBK
- SMILES: CCCCCC\C=C/C=C/CCCCCCCC(=O)O

Properties
Chemical formula	C_{18}H_{32}O_{2}
Molar mass	280.452 g·mol^{−1}
- Except where otherwise noted, data are given for materials in their standard state (at 25 °C [77 °F], 100 kPa). verify (what is ?) Infobox references

Rumenic acid, also known as bovinic acid, is a conjugated linoleic acid (CLA) found in the fat of ruminants and in dairy products. It is an omega-7 trans fatty acid. Its lipid shorthand name is cis-9, trans-11 18:2 acid. The name was proposed by Kramer et al. in 1998. It can be considered as the principal dietary form, accounting for as much as 85-90% of the total CLA content in dairy products.

== Biosynthesis and biotransformations ==
Rumenic acid is produced from vaccenic acid by the action of unsaturase enzymes. Rumenic acid is converted back to vaccenic acid en route to stearic acid.
