= Fat interesterification =

Chemical process

In the food industry and biochemistry, interesterification (IE) is a process that rearranges the fatty acids of a fat product, typically a mixture of triglycerides. The process implies breaking and reforming the ester bonds C–O–C that connect the fatty acid chains to the glycerol hubs of the fat molecules. The reactions involve catalysts, either inorganic chemicals (chemical interesterification, CIE) or enzymes (enzymatic interesterification, EIE).

This process is typically used to adjust the physical characteristics of the fat, such as melting point and plasticity, for specific uses. It can be used, for instance, to turn oils into solid or semisolid products by combining them with other solid fats. It can also be used to prevent separation of solid fractions in palm oil and lauric fats, or slow rancidification, or to create oils more suitable for deep frying.

In contrast to hydrogenation, interesterification itself generally retains the original distribution of fatty acids in the product and hence is expected to preserve its nutritional and health attributes. However, hydrogenation and other techniques may still be applied to the starting fats or to the products of IE, and the products may be blended with other fats. Also, some of the new triglycerides produced by IE may be fractionated (separated) through controlled crystallization.

Interesterified fats are used in many industrial food products, including cookies, crackers, biscuits, cakes and icings, dairy fat replacers, pie crust, popcorn, flatbread and tortillas.

== Feedstock ==
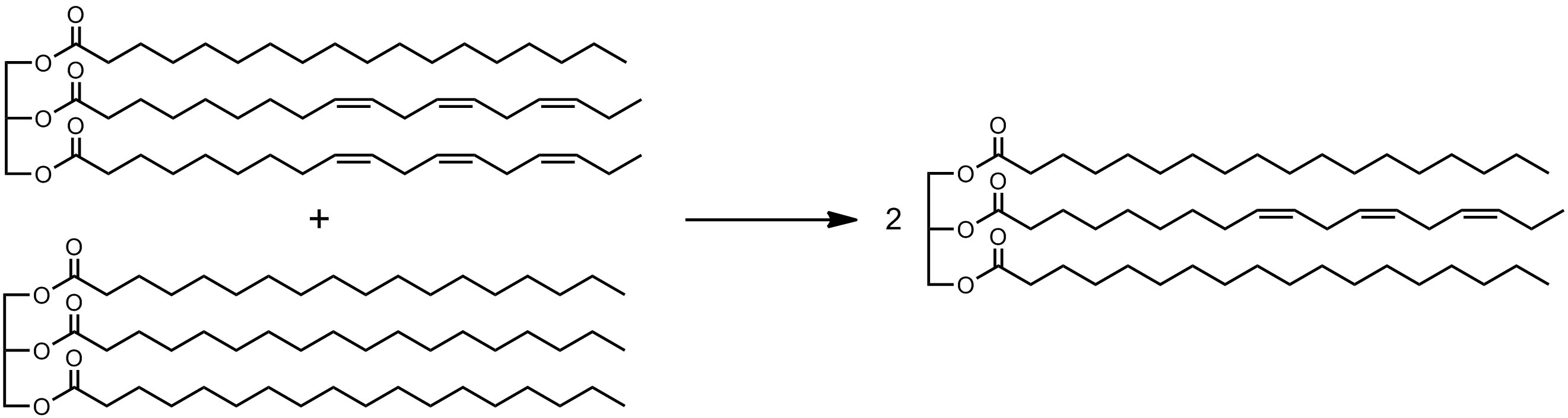
An example of interesterification between a triglyceride (top left) with two linolenic acid residues (LARs) and one stearic acid residue (SAR), and another triglyceride (bottom left) with three SARs, yielding two molecules with two SARs and one LAR each (right)

Typically the feedstock (starting product) is a mixture of two or more oils.

In particular, unsaturated vegetable oil can be interesterified with a fully hydrogenated version thereof, as in the illustration to the right. This procedure yields less saturated fat without creating the trans fat that would be produced by partial hydrogenation. The reaction does not go to completion, and the product will be a mixture of triglycerides with different amounts of saturation.

== Process ==
=== Chemistry ===
In principle, when interesterification is applied to two pure triglycerides, each with three identical fatty acids (AAA and BBB), the result could contain six different triglycerides (AAA, AAB, ABA, ABB, BAB, and BBB). The number is 6, rather than 2^{3} = 8, because of the symmetry of the glycerol backbone. The number is much greater if the feedstock has three or more distinct fatty acids.

=== "Chemical" interesterification ===
In the so-called chemical interesterification, the catalyst is an inorganic compound such as sodium methoxide. The reaction is carried out at high temperatures and creates three by-products—sodium soaps, fatty methyl esters, and monoglycerides, in addition to the interesterified fats.

=== Enzymatic interesterification ===
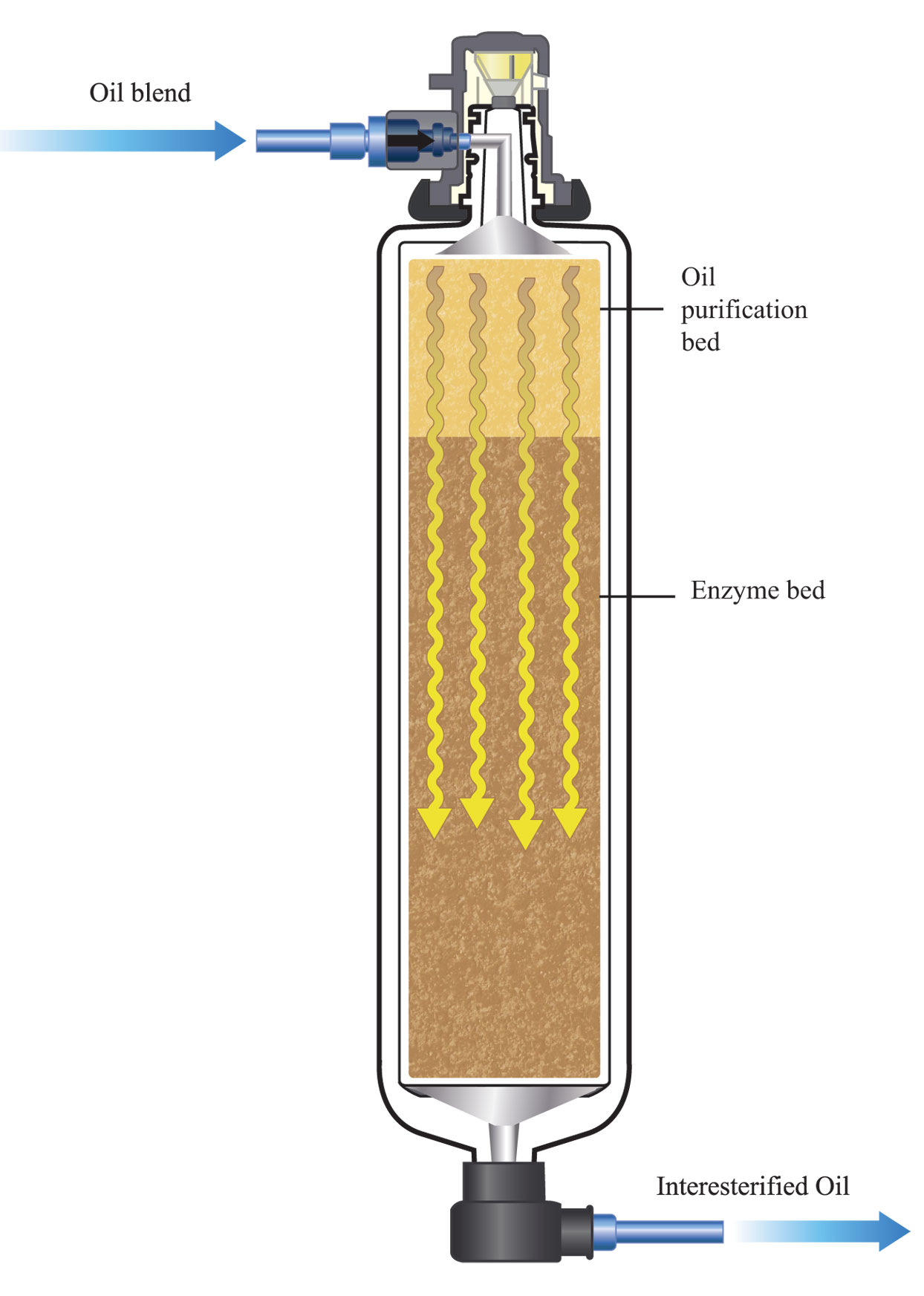
A Fixed-bed Filtration System, showing a blended liquid oil and solid (hard fat) oil flow through a system consisting of an oil purification bed and an enzyme bed

Enzymatic interesterification (IE) uses an enzyme to break and reform the ester bonds. Enzymes most suitable for this process are esterase; lipase; acylase; those enzymes that facilitate acidolysis reactions, transesterification reactions, ester synthesis, or ester interchange reactions; enzymes having phospholipase or protease activity, including thermostable and thermotolerant hydrolase activity; and polynucleotides.

Some enzymes will break and reform ester bonds only at positions 1 and 3 (sp1 and sp3) of the glycerol hub, leaving the acids in position 2 (sp2) fixed.

The most common industrial EIE process forces the liquid fat feedstock through a fixed-bed reactor that typically contains an oil purification bed followed by an enzyme bed. The latter has the enzyme fixed on some inert granular substrate. The first bed removes impurities from the oil blend that could inactivate the enzyme or affect its performance. The enzyme activity decreases over time, so flow must be carefully monitored and adjusted over time to maintain conversion.

Two or more reactors may be used in tandem, where the first reactor has the lowest enzyme activity and absorbs most of the impurities and harmful compounds. This sequencing protects the most active enzymes, which are in the last reactors.

IE has been replacing CIE because it has fewer processing steps, can be carried out at lower temperatures, produces no by-products, and has lower production costs.

== Advantages ==
Compared to simple blends, interesterified fats have a wider plasticity range, meaning that they retain their physical properties over a wider temperature range without separation of their components. IE can also use a wider variety of feedstocks, such as soybean oil; they provide a better risk management profile than globally produced palm oil.

== History ==
The earliest record of enzymatic interesterification was in 1844, when Théophile-Jules Pelouze published a study on the synthesis of a triglyceride through the esterification of glycerol by butyric acid. In 1920, Wilhelm Normann, who also patented the catalytic hydrogenation of fatty acids, was granted a patent for the chemical interesterification of edible lipids. This process became a viable option for the food industry, as it improved the spreadability and baking properties of the common shortening lard.

Enzymatic interesterification was developed in the 1970s by the team at the Unilever Research Center at Colworth House in England. Their work proved that the use of a specific enzyme predictably rearranged the fatty acids on the glycerol backbone of a triglyceride at positions 1 and 3. This provided an expanded range of available triglyceride types.

Still, EIE remained largely confined to research laboratories due to high enzyme prices. It was only in the 2000s that general concerns about the health effects of trans fats drove the industry to adopt interesterification as a replacement for partial hydrogenation, which had been the oil hardening method of choice due to its lower cost. Adoption was greatly facilitated by the development of enzymes bound to inert solid substrates like silica, by Novozymes and other companies.
