= Conjugated linoleic acid =

Group of compounds found in meat and dairy from ruminants

Rumenic acid, an example of conjugated linoleic acid

Conjugated linoleic acids (CLA) are a family of isomers of linoleic acid. In principle, 28 isomers are possible. CLA is found mostly in the meat and dairy products derived from ruminants. The two C=C double bonds are conjugated (i.e., separated by a single bond) as opposed by more typical polyunsaturated fatty acids where double bonds are separated by two single bonds.

In many natural CLAs, one of the two C=C bonds is cis and the other trans, making it a natural trans fatty acid. Fatty acids with a trans double bond in a conjugated system are exempt from trans fat labelling in the United States and the Codex Alimentarius.

CLA (especially ones with a trans bond) is naturally present in milkfat and beef. CLA is sold as a dietary supplement. Clinical studies have not confirmed any medical use for CLA.

== Chemistry ==
=== Chemical nomenclature ===
CLA describes a variety of isomers of octadecadienoic fatty acids. To uniquely identify a CLA molecule, a nomenclature resembling "cis-9-trans-11-CLA" is used, identifying the location and direction of the double bonds. This may be informally abbreviated as "c9,t11-CLA". Another equivalent is "(9Z,11E)-CLA", deriving from the E–Z notation.

Commonly, CLAs are studied as some mixture of isomers wherein the isomers c9,t11-CLA (rumenic acid) and t10,c12-CLA were the most abundant (which is typical of ruminant sources). Studies show however that individual isomers have distinct health effects.

=== Chemical properties ===
Conjugated linoleic acid is both a trans fatty acid and a cis fatty acid. The cis bond causes a lower melting point. CLA is conjugated, and in the United States, trans linkages in a conjugated system are not counted as trans fats for the purposes of nutritional regulations and labeling.

== Endogenous production ==
CLA and some trans isomers of oleic acid are produced by microorganisms in the rumens of ruminants. Non-ruminants, including humans, produce certain isomers of CLA from trans isomers of oleic acid, such as vaccenic acid, which is converted to c9,t11-CLA by delta-9 desaturase.

In healthy humans, CLA and the related conjugated linolenic acid (CLNA) isomers are bioconverted from linoleic acid and alpha-linolenic acid, respectively, mainly by Bifidobacterium bacteria strains inhabiting the gastrointestinal tract. However, this bioconversion may not occur at any significant level in those with a digestive disease, gluten sensitivity, or dysbiosis.

== Dietary sources ==
Food products from grass-fed ruminants (e.g. mutton and beef) are good sources of CLA and contain much more of it than those from grain-fed animals. Eggs from chickens that have been fed CLA are also rich in CLA, and CLA in egg yolks has been shown to survive the temperatures encountered during frying. Some mushrooms, such as Agaricus bisporus and Agaricus subrufescens, are rare non-animal sources of CLA.

However, dietary punicic acid—which is abundant in pomegranate seeds—is converted to the rumenic acid (which is (9Z,11E)-CLA) upon absorption in rats, suggesting that non-animal sources can still effectively provide dietary CLA.

== Health effects ==
CLA is marketed as a dietary supplement for its supposed anti-cancer and cardiovascular health benefit for which there is a lack of clinical evidence. It is also marketed as a bodybuilding aid. A 2015 review noted that studies have failed to provide conclusive evidence for the effectiveness of CLA on human health. A 2018 review found that CLA supplementation may increase inflammatory markers CRP and TNF-α.

Likewise, there is insufficient evidence that CLA has a useful benefit for overweight or obese people, as it has been found to have no long-term effect on body composition. Although CLA has shown an effect on insulin response in diabetic rats, there is currently no evidence of this effect in humans.

== History ==
In 1979 CLAs were found to inhibit chemically induced cancer in mice and research on its biological activity has continued.

In 2008, the United States Food and Drug Administration categorized CLA as generally recognized as safe (GRAS).

== See also ==
- Conjugated fatty acids
