= Phil Sokolof =

American health activist

- Born: December 15, 1921; Omaha, Nebraska, U.S.
- Died: April 15, 2004 (aged 82); Omaha, Nebraska, U.S.
- Occupations: Businessman; campaigner
- Known for: Heart disease activism
- Spouse: Ruth Rosinsky
- Children: 2

Phil Sokolof (December 15, 1921 – April 15, 2004) was a multi-millionaire businessman and campaigner against heart disease. In the 1980s and early 1990s, his fight for heart health targeted the restaurant chain McDonald's. He is credited with using his own assets to help spur notable changes.

His research led him to believe that high-fat foods were the primary culprit behind cardiovascular disease. In the 1980s he founded the National Heart Savers Association.

== Campaigning ==
Sokolof's efforts regarding the McDonald's menu ended the practice of cooking their French fries in beef tallow. He waged campaigns against the use of so-called "tropical" oils, such as coconut and palm oils, which were used to manufacture many cookies and crackers. Sokolof's campaign forced several manufacturers, including Ralston Purina, Borden, Pillsbury, Quaker Oats, Sunshine Biscuits, Pepperidge Farm, and Keebler to end their use of tropical oils in their products.

After those achievements, Sokolof's campaigned against fat in people's diet. In 1995, Bryant Gumbel introduced him to debate the Today show as "America's No. 1 Cholesterol Fighter". Sokolof took out ads decrying the popularity of 2% milk, arguing that it is not low-fat, and encouraged parents to only buy skim milk. In 1997, he urged Michael Jordan and Tiger Woods not to endorse McDonald's. In 2002, Sokolof purchased full-page ads, asking fellow Omaha native Warren Buffett not to purchase Burger King.

Sokolof died on April 15, 2004, of heart failure at the age of 82. He was buried at "Pleasant Hill Jewish Cemetery" in Omaha, Nebraska. The Los Angeles Times eulogized Sokolof saying, "In our big, complex bureaucratized society, there was indeed a case where one person made a difference, and where an idea had definite and beneficial consequences."
