= Wilhelm Normann =

German chemist (1870–1939)

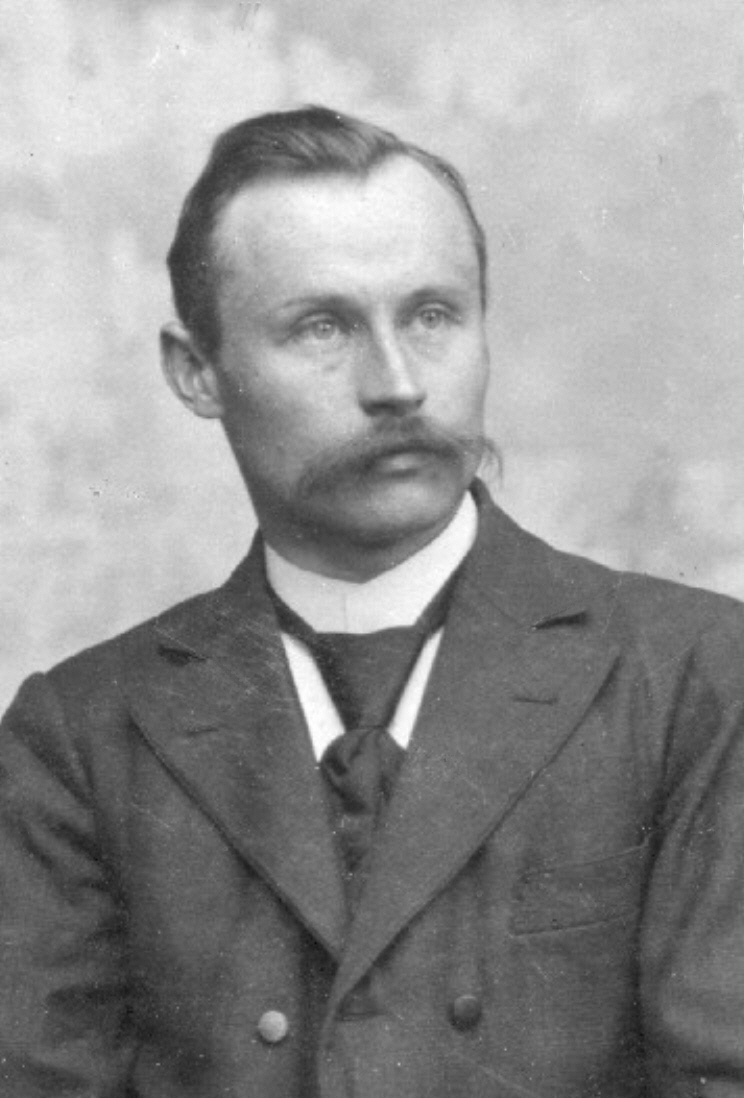
- Wilhelm Norman (1905)
- Born: 16 January 1870; Petershagen, North Rhine-Westphalia, Germany
- Died: 1 May 1939 (aged 69); Chemnitz, Saxony, Germany
- Occupation: Chemist
- Known for: Hydrogenation

Wilhelm Normann (16 January 1870, in Petershagen – 1 May 1939, in Chemnitz) (sometimes also spelled Norman) was a German chemist who introduced the hydrogenation of fats in 1901. This invention, protected by German patent 141,029 in 1902, had a profound influence on the production of margarine and vegetable shortening.

== Early life and education ==
His father, Julius Normann, was the principal of the elementary school and Selekta in Petershagen. His mother was Luise Normann, née Siveke.

Normann attended primary school from 31 March 1877. At Easter of his sixth grade he moved to the Friedrichs Gymnasium in Herford. After his father applied for a teacher's job at the municipal secondary school in Kreuznach, Wilhelm changed to the Royal Secondary School in Kreuznach. He passed his examinations and left school at the age of 18.

== Career ==
Normann began work at the Herford machine fat and oil factory Leprince & Siveke in 1888. The founder of that company was his uncle, Wilhelm Siveke. After running a branch of the company in Hamburg for two years, he started studying chemistry at the laboratory of Professor Carl Remigius Fresenius in Wiesbaden. From April 1892 Normann continued his studies at the department of oil analytics at the Technische Hochschule in Charlottenburg (now Technische Universität Berlin) under the supervision of Professor D. Holde. From 1895 to 1900 he studied chemistry under supervision of Prof. Claus and Prof. Willgerod and geology under supervision of Prof. Steinmann at the Albert Ludwigs University of Freiburg. There he received his doctorate in 1900 with a work about Beiträge zur Kenntnis der Reaktion zwischen unterchlorigsauren Salzen und primären aromatischen Aminen ("Contributions to the knowledge of the reactions of hypochlorite salts and primary aromatic amines"). In 1901 Normann was appointed as correspondent of the Federal Geological Institute.

== Primary work ==
From 1901 to 1909 he was head of the laboratory at Leprince & Siveke, where conducted investigations of the properties of fats and oils.

In 1901 Normann heard about Paul Sabatier publishing an article, in which Sabatier stated that only with vaporizable organic compounds it is possible to bind catalytic hydrogen to fluid tar oils. Normann investigated and disproved Sabatier's assertion. He was able to transform liquid oleic acid into solid stearic acid by the use of catalytic hydrogenation with dispersed nickel. This was the precursor of saturated fat hardening.

On 27 February 1901 Normann invented what he called fat hardening, which was the process of producing saturated fats. On 14 August 1902 the German Imperial patent office granted patent 141,029 to the Leprince & Siveke Company, and on 21 January 1903 Normann was granted the British patent, GB 190301515 "Process for Converting Unsaturated Fatty Acids or their Glycerides into Saturated Compounds".

During the years 1905 to 1910 Normann built a fat hardening facility in the Herford company. In 1908 the patent was bought by Joseph Crosfield & Sons Limited of Warrington, England. From the autumn of 1909 hardened fat was being successfully produced in what in a large scale plant in Warrington. The initial year's production was nearly 3,000 tonnes (3,000 long tons; 3,300 short tons). When Lever Brothers produced a rival process Crosfield took them to court over patent infringement, which Crosfield lost.

From 1911 to 1922, Normann was scientific director of Ölwerke Germania (Germania Oil Factory) in Emmerich am Rhein, which was established by the Dutch Jürgens company.

From 1917, Normann built a fat hardening factory in Antwerp for the margarine company SAPA Societe anonyme des grasses, huiles et produits africaines, which operated in India. He served as technical director by order of the Belgian Colonial Society.

On 25 April 1920 he filed for German patent 407180 Verfahren zur Herstellung von gemischten Glyceriden (Procedure for the production of mixed glycerides), which was approved on 9 December 1924.

On 26 June 1920 the Firma Oelwerke Germania and Dr Wilhelm Normann filed for German patent 417215, Verfahren zur Umesterung von Fettsaurestern. (Procedure for the transesterification of fatty esters), which was approved on 27 September 1925.

From 1924 to 1927 Normann was a consultant for fat hardening facilities for foreign companies.

On 30 October 1926 Normann and the Volkmar Haenig & Comp, Metallochemische Werk Rodlebe company filed for German patent 564894, for Elektrisch beheizter Etagenroester (Electrically heated esters), approved 24 November 1932.

On 14 May 1929 he applied for German patent 582266, Verfahren zur Darstellung von Estern (Procedure for the representation of esters), which was approved on 11 August 1933.

== Personal life ==
Normann married Martha Uflerbäumer of Herford on 12 September 1916.

On 1 January 1939 Normann retired, and he died on 1 May 1939 after an illness in the Küchwald Hospital in Chemnitz. He was entombed on 5 May 1939 in the family grave at the old cemetery on Hermannstrasse in Herford.

== Awards ==
- 8 June 1922: Award of the Liebig Medal by the German Chemical Society.
- February 1939: awarded an honorary doctorate of natural sciences by the Faculty of Natural Sciences and the senate of the University of Münster in Westfalen.
- 1939: awarded honorary membership in the Deutsche Gesellschaft für Fettforschung (DGF; German Society for Fat Research), today Deutsche Gesellschaft für Fettwissenschaft (German Society for Fat Science), Münster.

In commemoration of the inventor of fat hardening the DGF donated the Wilhelm Normann Medal on 15 May 1940. Since 1940 it has been irregularly awarded.

The Wilhelm-Normann-Berufskolleg (Wilhelm Normann Professional College) in Herford was named after Normann.

== See also ==
- Timeline of hydrogen technologies
