= Joseph Crosfield =

Joseph Crosfield (5 October 1792 – 16 February 1844) was a businessman who established a soap and chemical manufacturing business in Warrington, which was in the historic county of Lancashire and is now in the ceremonial county of Cheshire. This business was to become the firm of Joseph Crosfield and Sons.

== Early life ==
Joseph Crosfield was born in Warrington, the fourth son of George Crosfield and his wife Ann née Key. The Crosfield family had been Quakers since the time of George Fox and this tradition was maintained by George and subsequently by Joseph. George Crosfield was a wholesale grocer in Warrington who also had interests in a sugar-refining business in Liverpool. The family moved to Lancaster in 1799 for George to develop a sugar-refining business there, while still keeping an interest in his grocery business in Warrington under the care of his assistant, Joseph Fell. Nothing is known of Joseph's early life in Lancaster. From September 1807, a time close to his 15th birthday, he was apprenticed for 6 years to Anthony Clapham, a druggist and chemist in Newcastle-upon-Tyne. By 1811 Anthony Clapham was also a soap manufacturer.

Lance-Corporal William H. Robinson, son of the late Mr W. H. Robinson for many years cashier at Joseph Crosfield and Sons, and president of the Warrington Cricket and Bowling Club.. He was also an active member of the Lodge of Friendship, No 2963. Its first Worshipful Master was Roger Charlton Parr Parr's Bank, whose grandfather founded the.

== Soap and alkali manufacture ==
In 1814, Joseph's apprenticeship having finished, at the age of 21 he decided to establish his own soap making business in Warrington. At this time soap manufacturing was growing rapidly in the Mersey bad recently developed canals and river navigations in the area which allowed for easier transport of the raw materials into the factories and for the distribution of the finished products. A number of new large soaperies had recently been established in the nearby towns of St Helens, Runcorn and Liverpool.

Joseph Crosfield's soapery was established on the north bank of a loop of the river Mersey in an area known as Bank Quay, near to urban Warrington but at that time separated from it by a stretch of fields. Other industrial premises were nearby. The premises occupied that of a failed wire mill and the business started with a capital of £1,500. It struggled at first, partly due to the trade depression at the time, but by 1818 it was making a profit.

In 1820 Joseph was joined in the business by his younger brother William (1805–1881). Later that year his father George died, leaving a legacy of £1,500 to Joseph. Around this time Joseph Fell also became a partner in the business. Also around this time Joseph Crosfield bought the machinery from a nearby corn mill.

In addition to making soap, like many other soapmakers Joseph Crosfield was involved in making candles. By the mid-1830s Crosfield's was producing around 900 tons of soap annually. In 1832 they were the 25th largest business in the list of 296 soapmakers in England and Scotland that year. Joseph carried out most of the clerical work himself in the business, employing only one clerk.

Joseph Crosfield became engaged in a variety of other business enterprises. One of these was the old grocery business of Crosfield & Fell, where he replaced his father after the latter's death. He continued to run the corn-mill from which he had bought the machinery. By the 1830s most soap makers were manufacturing their own alkali by the Leblanc process, rather than using alkali from vegetable sources. Joseph Crosfield was no exception. Rather than manufacturing it in his Bank Quay site, he took over a bankrupt alum works in St Helens, Merseyside with his older brother James (1787–1852) and Josias Christopher Gamble. Here he continued to make alum and also manufactured alkali by the Leblanc process. Joseph's younger brother Simon (1803–1864) later became a partner in this business.

== Other investments ==
During this time Joseph's soap-making business was making large profits but, rather than investing them into this business, he put the money into other enterprises, most of which lost money. He had an interest in glass-making, buying shares in the Manchester & Liverpool Plate Glass Company in 1836 and he took out a patent for an improvement in the manufacture of plate glass; but the company failed. He also lost a considerable amount of money in a partnership in the Wharf Meadow cotton-mill. He did better with his investments into joint-stock banks, his first investment being into the Manchester Joint-Stock Banking Company. In 1831 a branch of the Manchester and Liverpool District Banking Company opened in Warrington and in time Joseph became a large shareholder and local director of this bank.

In common with many other businessmen of the time, Joseph became involved with the newly opening railways. His major interest was in the St Helens and Runcorn Gap Railway. After investing in this enterprise in 1830 he became a director in 1836. He speculated in other local railway lines, making gains with some and losses with others. He also speculated in a number of foreign investments, usually breaking even or suffering small losses.

== Political, civic and religious life ==
Joseph Crosfield was also deeply involved in the political, civic and religious life of Warrington. In addition to his continuing Quaker activities, he was a Radical in politics, often campaigning on issues relating to both of these movements. He was a life governor and permanent committee member of the Dispensary and Infirmary in the town. He served on the Warrington Board of Health which was set up in 1832 at the time of the cholera epidemic. He was involved with education, not only in setting up Quaker schools in Penketh and Warrington, but also with the founding of the Warrington Educational Society in 1838 for educating the working classes. He took an interest in the Warrington Mechanics' Institution and the Warrington Circulating Library.

== Personal life ==
In 1819 Joseph Crosfield married Elizabeth Goad from the village of Baycliffe in the Furness area of Lancashire. Joseph and his family lived close to his works. After his marriage his first house was Mersey Bank, a fairly large house standing in its own grounds to the west of the factory. In 1826 he leased a plot of land nearby at White Cross on which he built a new house and in which he lived for the rest of his life. He and Elizabeth had ten children. Joseph died in 1844 after a short illness when he was aged 51. He was buried in the burial ground of the Friends' meeting house in Buttermarket Street, Warrington.

== Crosfields after Joseph ==
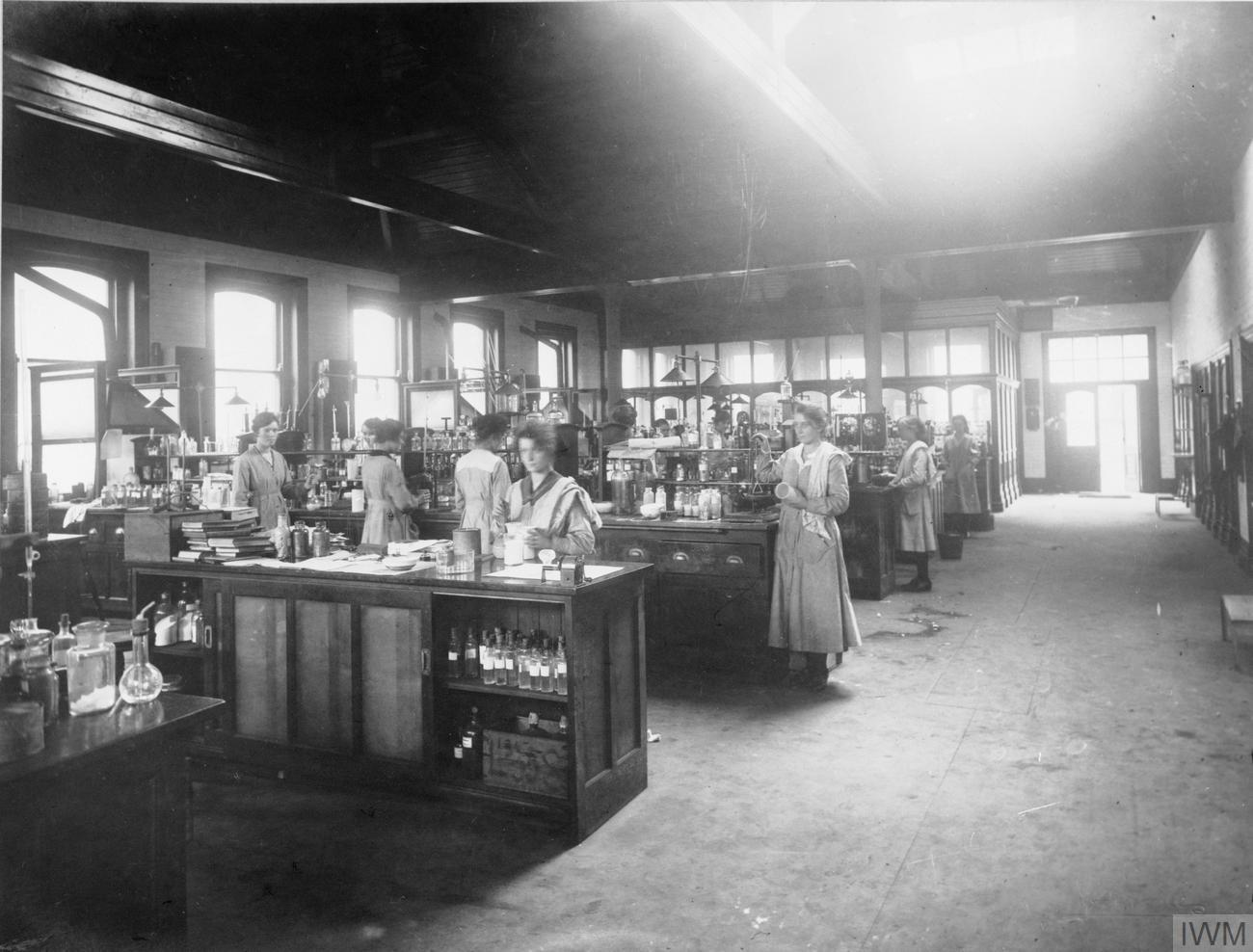
Workers in the laboratory of a caustic soda works of Joseph Crosfield & Sons Limited at Warrington during World War I

The firm of Joseph Crosfield & Sons, Ltd. continued to thrive and grow after his death, producing a variety of chemicals.

The business passed to Sir Arthur Henry Crosfield, who built Witanhurst, a house in North London, on the proceeds of the sale of the company, and was returned for Parliament as the Liberal MP for Warrington.

In 1911 the company was purchased by Brunner, Mond & Company and 1919 it was absorbed into Lever Brothers. From 1929 Crosfield was a subsidiary of Unilever. In 1997 its Warrington speciality chemicals division that made ingredients for detergents and toothpastes was acquired by ICI and in 2001, Ineos Capital purchased the company. The name Crosfield was finally lost as it was renamed Ineos Silicas. In 2008 Ineos Silicas was merged with PQ Corporation, with the new company retaining the name of PQ Corporation.

== See also ==
- Warrington Transporter Bridge (Bank Quay Transporter Bridge)
