= C20H38O2 =

The molecular formula C_{20}H_{38}O_{2} may refer to:

- Eicosanolide
- Eicosenoic acids
  - Paullinic acid, also called 7-eicosenoic acid
  - Prostanoic acid, also called 9-eicosenoic acid
  - 11-Eicosenoic acid, also called gondoic acid
- Ethyl oleate
- Gadoleic acid
- Vaccenyl acetate
