= List of unsaturated fatty acids =

ω−n	Common name	Lipid Numbers	Δ^{n}	Structural Formula	Trans or Cis	Naturally Occurring in
ω−3	α-Linolenic acid	C18:3	Δ^{9,12,15}	CH_{3}CH_{2}CH=CHCH_{2}CH=CHCH_{2}CH=CH(CH_{2})_{7}COOH	cis	flaxseeds, chia seeds, walnuts
ω−3	Stearidonic acid	C18:4	Δ^{6,9,12,15}	CH_{3}CH_{2}CH=CHCH_{2}CH=CHCH_{2}CH=CHCH_{2}CH=CH( CH_{2})_{4}COOH	cis	seed oils of hemp, blackcurrant, corn gromwell
ω−3	Eicosapentaenoic acid	C20:5	Δ^{5,8,11,14,17}	CH_{3}CH_{2}CH=CHCH_{2}CH=CHCH_{2}CH=CHCH_{2}CH=CHCH_{2} CH=CH(CH_{2})_{3}COOH	cis	cod liver, herring, mackerel, salmon, menhaden and sardine
ω−3	Cervonic acid	C22:6	Δ^{4,7,10,13,16,19}	CH_{3}CH_{2}CH=CHCH_{2}CH=CHCH_{2}CH=CHCH_{2}CH=CHCH_{2} CH=CHCH_{2}CH=CH(CH_{2})_{2}COOH	cis	maternal milk, fish oil
ω−6	Linoleic acid	C18:2	Δ^{9,12}	CH_{3}(CH_{2})_{4}CH=CHCH_{2}CH=CH(CH_{2})_{7}COOH	cis	peanut oil, chicken fat, olive oil
ω−6	Linolelaidic acid	C18:2	Δ^{9,12}	CH_{3}(CH_{2})_{4}CH=CHCH_{2}CH=CH(CH_{2})_{7}COOH	trans	partially hydrogenated vegetable oils
ω−6	γ-Linolenic acid	C18:3	Δ^{6,9,12}	CH_{3}(CH_{2})_{4}CH=CHCH_{2}CH=CHCH_{2}CH=CH(CH_{2})_{4}COOH	cis	borage oil, black currant oil, evening primrose oil and safflower oil
ω−6	Dihomo-γ-linolenic acid	C20:3	Δ^{8,11,14}	CH_{3}(CH_{2})_{4}CH=CHCH_{2}CH=CHCH_{2}CH=CH(CH_{2})_{6}COOH	cis	only in trace amounts in animal products
ω−6	Arachidonic acid	C20:4	Δ^{5,8,11,14}	CH_{3}(CH_{2})_{4}CH=CHCH_{2}CH=CHCH_{2}CH=CHCH_{2} CH=CH(CH_{2})_{3}COOH	cis	
ω−6	Docosatetraenoic acid	C22:4	Δ^{7,10,13,16}	CH_{3}(CH_{2})_{4}CH=CHCH_{2}CH=CHCH_{2}CH=CHCH_{2} CH=CH(CH_{2})_{5}COOH	cis	
ω−7	Palmitoleic acid	C16:1	Δ^{9}	CH_{3}(CH_{2})_{5}CH=CH(CH_{2})_{7}COOH	cis	macadamia nuts
ω−7	Vaccenic acid	C18:1	Δ^{11}	CH_{3}(CH_{2})_{5}CH=CH(CH_{2})_{9}COOH	trans	dairy products such as milk, butter, and yogurt
ω−7	Paullinic acid	C20:1	Δ^{13}	CH_{3}(CH_{2})_{5}CH=CH(CH_{2})_{11}COOH	cis	guarana
ω−9	Oleic acid	C18:1	Δ^{9}	CH_{3}(CH_{2})_{7}CH=CH(CH_{2})_{7}COOH	cis	olive oil, pecan oil, canola oil
ω−9	Elaidic acid	C18:1	Δ^{9}	CH_{3}(CH_{2})_{7}CH=CH(CH_{2})_{7}COOH	trans	hydrogenated vegetable oil
ω−9	Gondoic acid	C20:1	Δ^{11}	CH_{3}(CH_{2})_{7}CH=CH(CH_{2})_{9}COOH	cis	jojoba oil (edible but non-caloric and non-digestible)
ω−9	Erucic acid	C22:1	Δ^{13}	CH_{3}(CH_{2})_{7}CH=CH(CH_{2})_{11}COOH	cis	wallflower seed, mustard oil
ω−9	Nervonic acid	C24:1	Δ^{15}	CH_{3}(CH_{2})_{7}CH=CH(CH_{2})_{13}COOH	cis	King salmon, flaxseed, sockeye salmon, sesame seed, macadamia nuts
ω−9	Mead acid	C20:3	Δ^{5,8,11}	CH_{3}(CH_{2})_{7}CH=CHCH_{2}CH=CHCH_{2}CH=CH(CH_{2})_{3}COOH	cis	cartilage

== Fatty acid molecular species ==
=== Mono-unsaturated fatty acid ===
The following fatty acids have one unsaturated bond.

==== Crotonic acid ====
Crotonic acid has 4 carbons, is included in croton oil, and is a trans-2-mono-unsaturated fatty acid. C_{3}H_{5} CO_{2}H, IUPAC organization name (E)-but-2-enoic acid, trans-but-2-enoic acid, numerical representation 4:1, n-1, molecular weight 86.09, melting point 72–74 °C, boiling point 180–181 °C, specific gravity 1.027. CAS registry number 107–93–7.

==== Myristoleic ====
Myristoleic acid has 14 carbons, is found in whale blubber, and is a cis-9-monounsaturated fatty acid. C_{13}H_{25}CO_{2}H, IUPAC organization name (Z)-tetradec-9-enoic acid, numerical representation 14:1, n-5, molecular weight 226.36, melting point of −4.5 – −4 °C. CAS Registry Number 544–64–9.

==== Palmitoleic acid ====
Palmitoleic acid has 16 carbons, is found in cod liver oil, sardine oil, and herring oil, and is a cis-9-monounsaturated fatty acid. C_{15}H_{29}CO_{2}H, IUPAC organization name (Z)-hexadec-9-enoic acid, n-7, numerical representation of 16:1, molecular weight 254.41, melting point 5 °C, specific gravity 0.894. CAS Registry Number 373–49–9.

==== Sapienic acid ====
Sapienic acid has 16 carbons, is found in the skin, and is a cis-6-mono-unsaturated fatty acid. C_{15}H_{29}CO_{2}H, IUPAC organization name (Z)-6-Hexadecenoic acid, n-10, numerical expression 16:1, molecular weight 254.41. CAS Registry Number 17004–51–2.

==== Oleic acid ====
Oleic acid has 18 carbons, is found in most animal fats and olive oil, and is a cis-9-monounsaturated fatty acid. C_{17}H_{33}CO_{2}H, IUPAC organization name (Z)-octadec-9-enoic acid, numerical representation 18:1 (9), n-9, molecular weight 282.46, melting point 13.4 °C, specific gravity 0.891. CAS Registry Number 112–80–1.

==== Elaidic acid ====
Elaidic acid has 18 carbons and is a trans-9-mono-unsaturated fatty acid. It is also a trans isomer of oleic acid. C_{17}H_{33}CO_{2}H, IUPAC organization name (E)-octadec-9-enoic acid, numerical representation 18:1 (9), n-9, molecular weight 282.46, melting point 43–45 °C. CAS Registry Number 112–79–8.

==== Vaccenic acid ====
Vaccenic acid has 18 carbons, is found in beef tallow, mutton, and butter, and is a trans-11-mono-unsaturated fatty acid. C_{17}H_{33}CO_{2}H, IUPAC organization name (E)-octadec-11-enoic acid, numerical representation 18:1 (11) n-7, molecular weight 282.46. CAS Registry Number 506–17–2.

==== Gadoleic acid ====
Gadoleic acid has 20 carbons, is found in cod liver oil and other marine animal oils, and is a cis-9-mono-unsaturated fatty acid. C_{19}H_{37}CO_{2}H, IUPAC organization name (Z)-icos-9-enoic acid, numerical representation 20:1 (9), n-11, molecular weight 310.51. CAS Registry Number 29204–02–2.

==== Eicosenoic acid ====
Eicosenoic acid has 20 carbons, is found in a wide variety of plant oils, and is a cis-11-mono-unsaturated fatty acid. C_{19}H_{37}CO_{2}H, IUPAC organization name (Z)-icos-11-enoic acid, numerical representation 20:1 (11), n-9, molecular weight 310.51. CAS Registry Number 5561–99–9.

==== Erucic acid ====
Erucic acid has 22 carbons, is found in rapeseed oil and mustard oil, and is a cis-13-monounsaturated is a fatty acid. C_{21}H_{41}CO_{2}H, IUPAC organization name (Z)-docos-13-enoic acid, numerical representation 22:1, n-9, molecular weight 338.57, melting point 33–35 °C. CAS Registry Number 112–86–7.

==== Nervonic acid ====
Nervonic acid has 24 carbons, is found in brain glycolipids (Nervon) and sphingomyelin, and is a cis-15-mono-unsaturated fatty acid. C_{23}H_{45}CO_{2}H, IUPAC organization name (Z)-tetracos-15-enoic acid, numerical representation 24:1, n-9, molecular weight 366.62, melting point 42–43 °C. CAS Registry Number 506–37–6.

=== Di-unsaturated fatty acid ===
The following fatty acids have two unsaturated bonds.

==== Linoleic acid ====
Linoleic acid has 18 carbons, is contained in many vegetable oils, particularly semi-drying oils, and is a cis-9-cis-12-di-unsaturated fatty acid. C_{17}H_{31}CO_{2}H, IUPAC organization name (9Z, 12Z)-octadeca-9,12-dienoic acid, numerical representation 18:2 (9,12), n-6, molecular weight 280.45, melting point −5 °C, specific gravity 0.902. CAS Registry Number 60–33–3. There are isomers of linoleic acid with double bonds separated by one single bond. They are named conjugated linoleic acids.

==== Eicosadienoic acid ====
Eicosadienoic acid (eicosadienoic's) has 20 carbons and is a cis-11-cis-14-di-unsaturated fatty acid. C_{19}H_{35}CO_{2}H, IUPAC organization name (11Z, 14Z)-icosa-11,14-dienoic acid, numerical representation 20:2 (11,14), n-6, molecular weight 308.50.

==== Docosadienoic acid ====
Docosadienoic acid (docosadienoic's) has 22 carbons and is a cis-13-cis-16-di-unsaturated fatty acid. C_{21}H_{39}CO_{2}H, IUPAC organization name (13Z, 16Z)-docosa-13,16-dienoic acid, numerical representation 22:2 (13,16), n-6, molecular weight 336.55. CAS Registry Number 7370–49–2.

=== Tri-unsaturated fatty acids ===
The following fatty acids have three unsaturated bonds.

==== Linolenic acid ====
α-Linolenic acid (alpha-linolenic's) has 18 carbons, is found in linseed oil and drying oil, and is a 9,12,15-tri-unsaturated fatty acid. C_{17}H_{29}CO_{2}H, IUPAC organization name (9Z, 12Z, 15Z)-octadeca-9,12,15-trienoic acid, numerical representation 18:3 (9,12,15), n-3, molecular weight 278.43, melting point −11 °C, specific gravity 0.914. CAS Registry Number 463–40–1.

γ-Linolenic acid (gamma-linolenic's) has 18 carbons, is the structural isomer of α-linolenic acid. IUPAC organization name (6Z, 9Z, 12Z)-octadeca-6,9,12-trienoic acid, numerical representation 18:3 (6,9,12), n-6. CAS Registry Number 506–26–3.

==== Pinolenic acid ====
Pinolenic acid (pinolenic's) has 18 carbons, is found in pine nuts, and is a 5,9,12-triunsaturated fatty acid. C_{17}H_{29}CO_{2}H, IUPAC organization name (5Z, 9Z, 12Z)-octadeca-5,9,12-trienoic acid, numerical representation 18:3 (5,9,12), n-6, molecular weight 278.43. CAS Registry Number 16833–54–8.

==== Eleostearic acid ====
α-Eleostearic acid (alpha-eleostearic's) has 18 carbons, is found in Kiri drying oil, and is a 9,11,13-triunsaturated fatty acid. C_{17}H_{29}CO_{2}H, IUPAC organization name (9Z, 11E, 13E)-octadeca-9,11,13-trienoic acid, numerical representation 18:3 (9,11,13), n-5, molecular weight 278.43.

β-Eleostearic acid (beta-eleostearic's, beta-eleostearic acid) is a geometric isomer of α-eleostearic acid. IUPAC organization name (9E, 11E, 13E)-octadeca-9,11,13-trienoic acid, numerical representation 18:3 (9,11,13), n-5.

α- and β-Eleostearic acids are cis–trans isomers. Other cis–trans isomers of eleostearic acid are:

Catalpic acid (9E, 11E, 13Z)
Punicic acid (9Z, 11E, 13Z).

==== Mead acid ====
Mead acid (Mead's) has 20 carbons, is a 5,8,11-tri-unsaturated fatty acid. C_{19}H_{33}CO_{2}H, IUPAC organization name (5Z, 8Z, 11Z)-icosa-5,8,11-trienoic acid, numerical representation 20:3 (5,8,11), n-9, molecular weight 306.48. CAS Registry Number 20590–32–3.

==== Dihomo-γ-linolenic acid ====
Dihomo-γ-linolenic acid (dihomo-gamma-linolenic's, dihomo-gamma-linolenic acid, DGLA) has 20 carbons, and is an 8,11,14-tri-unsaturated fatty acid. C_{19}H_{33}CO_{2}H, IUPAC organization name (8Z, 11Z, 14Z)-icosa-8,11,14-trienoic acid, numerical representation 20:3 (8,11,14), n-6, molecular weight 306.48. CAS Registry Number 1783–84–2.

==== Eicosatrienoic acid ====
Eicosatrienoic acid (eicosatrienoic's, eicosatrienoic acid) has 20 carbons and is an 11,14,17- tri unsaturated fatty acid. C_{19}H_{33}CO_{2}H, IUPAC organization name (11Z, 14Z, 17Z)-icosa-11,14,17-trienoic acid, numerical representation 20:3 (11,14,17), n-3, molecular weight 306.48.

=== Tetra-unsaturated fatty acids ===
The following fatty acids have four unsaturated bonds.

==== Stearidonic acid ====
Stearidonic acid (stearidonic's) has 18 carbons, is found in sardine oil and herring oil, and is a 6,9,12,15-tetraunsaturated fatty acid. C_{17}H_{27}CO_{2}H, IUPAC organization name (6Z, 9Z, 12Z, 15Z)-octadeca-6,9,12,15-tetraenoic acid, numerical representation 18:4 (6,9,12,15), n-3, molecular weight 276.41. CAS Registry Number 20290–75–9.

==== Arachidonic acid ====
Arachidonic acid (arachidonic's) has 20 carbons, is present in animal visceral fat (brain, liver, kidney, lung, spleen), and is a 5,8,11,14-tetra-unsaturated fatty acid. C_{19}H_{31}CO_{2}H, IUPAC organization name (5Z, 8Z, 11Z, 14Z)-icosa-5,8,11,14-tetraenoic acid, numerical representation 20:4 (5,8,11,14), n-6, molecular weight 304.47, boiling point 169–171 °C. CAS Registry Number 506–32–1.

In signal transduction, arachidonic acid is produced through decomposition of the phospholipid cell membrane. This gives rise to the arachidonic acid cascade, a metabolic pathway that yields lipid mediator compounds such as prostaglandins, thromboxanes and leukotrienes. This pathway has attracted study for its key role in inflammatory diseases such as asthma.

==== Eicosatetraenoic acid ====
Eicosatetraenoic acid (eicosatetraenoic's) has 20 carbons and is an 8,11,14,17-tetraunsaturated fatty acid. C_{19}H_{31}CO_{2}H, IUPAC organization name (8Z, 11Z, 14Z, 17Z)-icosa-8,11,14,17-tetraenoic acid, numerical representation 20:4 (8,11,14,17), n-3, molecular weight 304.47.

==== Adrenic acid ====
Adrenic acid (adrenic'sd) has 22 carbons and is a 7,10,13,16-tetra-unsaturated fatty acid. C_{21}H_{35}CO_{2}H, IUPAC organization name (7Z, 10Z, 13Z, 16Z)-docosa-7,10,13,16-tetraenoic acid, numerical representation 22:4 (7,10,13,16), n-6, molecular weight 332.52. CAS Registry Number 28874–58–0.

=== Penta-unsaturated fatty acids ===
The following fatty acids have five unsaturated bonds.

==== Bosseopentaenoic acid ====
Bosseopentaenoic acid (Boseopentaen's), has 20 carbons and is a 5,8,10,12,14-pentaunsaturated fatty acid. C_{17}H_{25}CO_{2}H, IUPAC organization name (5Z, 8Z, 10E, 12E, 14Z)-eicosa-5,8,10,12,14-pentaenoic acid, numerical representation 20:5 (5,8,10,12,14), n-6, molecular weight 302.46 g·mol−1.

==== Eicosapentaenoic acid ====
Eicosapentaenoic acid (EPA) has 20 carbons, is found in fish oil, is a pentaunsaturated fatty acid. It is one of the essential fatty acids. The recommendation of ingesting fish oil supplements during pregnancy is said to help increase the cognitive ability at 6 months, but mercury concentration in fish products offsets the effect. In patients with hyperlipidemia and obstructive artery disease it can help lower triglycerides and also has an anti-platelet effect similar to other anti-platelet agents. It has also been shown to help in secondary prevention of ischemic heart disease as shown with the JELIS test.

C_{19}H_{29}CO_{2}H, IUPAC organization name (5Z, 8Z, 11Z, 14Z, 17Z)-icosa-5,8,11,14,17-pentaenoic acid, numerical representation of 20:5 (5,8,11,14,17), n-3, molecular weight 302.45, melting point −54 – −53 °C, specific gravity 0.943. CAS Registry Number 10417–94–4.

==== Ozubondo acid ====
Ozubondo acid (Ozubondo's, Osbond acid), has 22 carbons, is a 4,7,10,13,16- pentaunsaturated fatty acid. C_{21}H_{33}CO_{2}H, IUPAC organization name (4Z, 7Z, 10Z, 13Z, 16Z)-docosa-4,7,10,13,16-pentaenoic acid, numerical representation 22:5 (4,7,10,13,16), n-6, molecular weight 330.50. CAS Registry Number 25182–74–5

==== Sardine acid ====
Sardine acid (clupanodonic acid) has 22 carbons, is found in sardine oil and herring oil, is a 7,10,13,16,19- pentaunsaturated fatty acid. C_{21}H_{33}CO_{2}H, IUPAC organization name (7Z, 10Z, 13Z, 16Z, 19Z)-docosa-7,10,13,16,19-pentaenoic acid, numerical representation 22:5 (7,10,13,16,19), n-3, molecular weight 330.50.

==== Tetracosapentaenoic acid ====
Tetracosapentaenoic acid has 24 carbons, is a 9,12,15,18,21-penta unsaturated fatty acid. C_{23}H_{37}CO_{2}H, IUPAC organization name (9Z, 12Z, 15Z, 18Z, 21Z)-tetracosa-9,12,15,18,21-pentaenoic acid, numerical representation 24:5 (9,12,15,18,21), n-3, molecular weight 358.56.

=== Hexa-unsaturated fatty acids ===
The following fatty acids have six unsaturated bonds.

==== Cervonic acid ====
Cervonic acid (or docosahexaenoic acid) has 22 carbons, is found in fish oil, is a 4,7,10,13,16,19-hexa unsaturated fatty acid. In the human body its generation depends on consumption of omega 3 essential fatty acids (e.g., ALA or EPA), but the conversion process is inefficient. C_{21}H_{31}CO_{2}H, IUPAC organization name (4Z, 7Z, 10Z, 13Z, 16Z, 19Z)-docosa-4,7,10,13,16,19-hexaenoic acid, numerical representation 22:6 (4,7,10,13,16,19), n-3, molecular weight 328.49, melting point −44 °C, specific gravity 0.950. CAS Registry Number 6217–54–5.

==== Herring acid ====
Herring acid (Herring's, Nisinic acid) is a 6,9,12,15,18,21-hexa unsaturated fatty acid with 24 carbon atoms. C_{23}H_{35}CO_{2}H, IUPAC organization name (6Z, 9Z, 12Z, 15Z, 18Z, 21Z)-tetracosa-6,9,12,15,18,21-hexaenoic acid, numerical representation 24:6 (6,9,12,15,18,21), n-3, molecular weight 356.54.

== See also ==
- List of saturated fatty acids
- Carboxylic acid
  - List of carboxylic acids
- Dicarboxylic acid
