= Omega−9 fatty acid =

Family of unsaturated fatty acids

Omega−9 fatty acids (ω−9 fatty acids or n−9 fatty acids) are a family of unsaturated fatty acids which have in common a final carbon–carbon double bond in the omega−9 position; that is, the ninth bond from the methyl end of the fatty acid.

Unlike omega−3 fatty acids and omega−6 fatty acids, omega−9 fatty acids are not classed as essential fatty acids (EFA). This is both because they can be created by the human body from unsaturated fat, and are therefore not essential in the diet, and because the lack of an omega−6 double bond keeps them from participating in the reactions that form the eicosanoids.

== Overview ==
Some omega−9 fatty acids are common components of animal fat and vegetable oil. Two omega−9 fatty acids important in industry are:

- Oleic acid (18:1, n−9), which is a main component of olive oil, macadamia oil and other monounsaturated fats
- Erucic acid (22:1, n−9), which is found in rapeseed, wallflower seed, and mustard seed. Rapeseed with high erucic acid content is grown for commercial use in paintings and coatings as a drying oil. Canola oil comes from a cultivar of the rapeseed plant that has been bred, or in some cases genetically modified, to contain very little erucic acid.

Under severe conditions of EFA deprivation, mammals will elongate and desaturate oleic acid to make Mead acid, (20:3, n−9). This has been documented to a lesser extent in one study following vegetarians and semi-vegetarians who followed diets without substantial sources of EFA.

Omega−9 fatty acids
Common name	Lipid name	Chemical name
Hypogeic acid	16:1 (n−9)	(Z)-hexadec-7-enoic acid
Oleic acid	18:1 (n−9)	(Z)-octadec-9-enoic acid
Elaidic acid	18:1 (n−9)	(E)-octadec-9-enoic acid
Gondoic acid	20:1 (n−9)	(Z)-eicos-11-enoic acid
Mead acid	20:3 (n−9)	(5Z,8Z,11Z)-eicosa-5,8,11-trienoic acid
Erucic acid	22:1 (n−9)	(Z)-docos-13-enoic acid
Nervonic acid	24:1 (n−9)	(Z)-tetracos-15-enoic acid
Ximenic acid	26:1 (n−9)	(17E)-hexacos-17-enoic acid

== See also ==
- Polyunsaturated fatty acid, lists of fatty acids including omega−3, omega−6, and omega−9 fatty acids
- Omega−3 fatty acid
- Omega−6 fatty acid
- Omega−7 fatty acid
