= C16H30O2 =

The molecular formula C_{16}H_{30}O_{2} (molar mass: 254.40 g/mol, exact mass: 254.2246 u) may refer to:

- Hypogeic acid
- Palmitoleic acid
- Sapienic acid
