= Butterfat =

Fatty portion of milk

Butterfat or milkfat is the fatty portion of milk. Milk and cream are often sold according to the amount of butterfat they contain.

== Composition ==
Structure of a triglyceride containing myristic, palmitic, and oleic acid

Butterfat is mainly composed of triglycerides. Each triglyceride contains three fatty acids. Butterfat triglycerides contain the following amounts of fatty acids (by mass fraction):

Fatty acid content of butterfat
Type of fatty acid	pct
Lower saturated (at most C12)	11%
Myristic saturated C14	12%
Palmitic saturated C16	31%
Stearic saturated C18	11%
Palmitoleic monounsaturated C16:1	4%
Oleic monounsaturated C18:1	24%
Linoleic polyunsaturated C18:2	3%
Alpha-Linolenic polyunsaturated C18:3	1%
Trans (mainly vaccenic C18:1 trans-11)	3%
black: Saturated; grey: Monounsaturated; green: Polyunsaturated; blue: Trans

Butterfat contains about 3% trans fat, which is slightly less than 0.5 grams per US tablespoon. Trans fats occur naturally in meat and milk from ruminants. The predominant kind of trans fat found in milk is vaccenic fatty acid. Trans fats may be also found in some industrially produced foods, such as shortenings obtained by hydrogenation of vegetable oils. In light of recognized scientific evidence, nutritional authorities consider all trans fats equally harmful for health and recommend that their consumption be reduced to trace amounts. However, two Canadian studies have shown that vaccenic acid could be beneficial compared to vegetable shortenings containing trans fats, or a mixture of pork lard and soy fat, by lowering total LDL and triglyceride levels. A study by the US Department of Agriculture showed that vaccenic acid raises both HDL and LDL cholesterol, whereas industrial trans fats only raise LDL with no beneficial effect on HDL.

Butterfat contains 3 to 4% tributyrin, a triglyceride (fat) and precursor of the short-chain fatty acid butyric acid, and is the richest-known food source of tributyrin.

Milk fatty acids, length, and position on glycerol (1, 2, 3)
Fatty acid	length	mol% (rounded)	1	2	3
Butyryl	C4	12	0	0	100
Caproyl	C6	5	0	7	93
Caprylyl	C8	2	25	12	63
Capryl	C10	4	17	27	56
Lauryl	C12	4	42	53	5
Myristyl	C14	11	29	52	19
Palmityl	C16	24	47	45	8
Hexadecenoyl	C16:1	3	36	46	18
Stearyl	C18	7	49	45	6
Oleyl	C18:1	24	42	26	32
Linoleyl	C18:2	3	23	47	31

== Standards ==
Most countries have standards for minimum fat levels in dairy products.

=== United States ===
In the U.S., there are federal standards for butterfat content of dairy products.

- Milks
  - Non-fat milk, also labeled "fat-free milk" or "skim milk", contains less than 0.5% fat
  - Low-fat milk is 1% fat
  - Reduced-fat milk is 2% fat
  - Whole milk contains at least 3.25% fat
- Cheeses
  - Dry curd and nonfat cottage cheese contain less than 0.5% fat
  - Lowfat cottage cheese contains 0.5–2% fat
  - Cottage cheese contains at least 4% fat
  - Swiss cheese contains at least 43% fat relative to the total solids
  - Cheddar cheese contains at least 50% fat relative to the total solids
- Frozen desserts
  - Sherbet contains 1–2% fat
  - Lowfat ice cream, also called ice milk, contains no more than 2.6% fat
  - Ice cream contains at least 10% fat
  - Frozen custard, like ice cream, contains at least 10% fat, but it also must contain at least 1.4% egg yolk solids
- Creams
  - Half and half contains 10.5–18% fat
  - Light cream and sour cream contain 18–30% fat
  - Light whipping cream (often called simply "whipping cream") contains 30–36% fat
  - Heavy cream contains a minimum of 36% fat
  - Manufacturer's cream (not federally regulated) contains 40% fat
- Butter (including whipped butter) contains at least 80% fat
  - Clarified butter contains 99% fat.

== See also ==
- Buttermilk
- Clarified butter
- List of dairy products
