= Unsaturated fat =

Fat or fatty acid in which there is at least one double bond within the fatty acid chain

An unsaturated fat is a fat (triglyceride) containing at least one alkene group. Unsaturated fats can be further classified: monounsaturated fats, polyunsaturated fats, cis and trans fats. They are colorless. Unsaturated fats are derived from unsaturated fatty acids, common examples of which are oleic acid and linoleic acid.

In cellular metabolism, unsaturated fat molecules contain slightly less energy (i.e., fewer calories) than an equivalent amount of saturated fat. The greater the degree of unsaturation in a fatty acid (i.e., the more double bonds in the fatty acid) the more susceptible it becomes to lipid peroxidation (rancidity).

== Occurrence ==
The occurrence of unsaturated fats varies widely in nature. The saturated fatty acid components are almost exclusively stearic (C18) and palmitic acids (C16). Monounsaturated fats are almost exclusively oleic acid. Linolenic acid comprises most of the triunsaturated fatty acid component.

Fatty acid component (mole %) of selected fats
| fat source | saturated | monounsaturated | doubly unsaturated | triunsaturated |
|---|---|---|---|---|
| Palm kernel | 60–65 | 10–18 | 1–3 | trace |
| Cottonseed oil | 23–30 | 14–21 | 45–58 | trace |
| Corn oil | 10–15 | 25–35 | 40–60 | trace |
| Linseed oil | 8–11 | 18–26 | 14–20 | 51–56 |
| Soybean oil | 11–17 | 18–25 | 49–57 | 6–11 |
| Peanut oil | 12–17 | 35–42 | 39–44 | trace |
| Lard | 36–48 | 36–52 | 10–12 | 1 |
| Beef tallow | 43–64 | 26–45 | 2–6 | 1 |

== Analysis ==
The identification and quantitation of unsaturated fats is a well developed science. The degree of unsaturation of a sample is indicated by the iodine value or iodine number, the degree to which a fat adds iodine. The identification of individual fatty acids, saturated and saturated, that comprise a fat usually entails transesterification to give fatty acid methyl esters (FAMEs), which are amenable to separation and quantitation using gas chromatography. Classically, unsaturated isomers were separated and identified by argentation thin-layer chromatography.

== Chemistry and nutrition ==
Amounts of fat types in selected foods

Examples of unsaturated fatty acids are palmitoleic acid, oleic acid, myristoleic acid, linoleic acid, and arachidonic acid. Foods containing unsaturated fats include avocado, nuts, olive oil, and vegetable oils, such as canola. Meat products contain both saturated and unsaturated fats.

The amount of unsaturated fat consumed should be in a range of about 20-35% of one's daily caloric intake. Most foods contain both unsaturated and saturated fats.

== Membrane composition as a metabolic pacemaker ==
Studies on the cell membranes of mammals and reptiles discovered that mammalian cell membranes are composed of a higher proportion of polyunsaturated fatty acids (DHA, omega-3 fatty acid) than reptiles. Studies on bird fatty acid composition have noted similar proportions to mammals but with 1/3rd less omega-3 fatty acids as compared to omega-6 for a given body size. This fatty acid composition results in a more fluid cell membrane but also one that is permeable to various ions (H+ & Na+), resulting in cell membranes that are more costly to maintain. This maintenance cost has been argued to be one of the key causes for the high metabolic rates and concomitant warm-bloodedness of mammals and birds. However polyunsaturation of cell membranes may also occur in response to chronic cold temperatures as well. In fish increasingly cold environments lead to increasingly high cell membrane content of both monounsaturated and polyunsaturated fatty acids, to maintain greater membrane fluidity (and functionality) at the lower temperatures.

== See also ==
- List of unsaturated fatty acids
