= Omega fatty acid =

Omega fatty acid may refer to:

- Omega-3 fatty acid
- Omega-6 fatty acid
- Omega-7 fatty acid
- Omega-9 fatty acid
