= Genetics of aggression =

Dopaminergic pathways of the human brain, showing mesocortical, mesolimbic, nigrostriatal, and tuberoinfundibular pathways. Created by Slashme, Patrick J. Lynch, and Fvasconcellos. Licensed under Creative Commons Attribution-Share Alike 4.0 International. Source: Wikimedia Commons – Dopaminergic pathways.svg

The field of psychology has been greatly influenced by the study of genetics. Decades of research have demonstrated that both genetic and environmental factors play a role in a variety of behaviors in humans and animals (e.g. Grigorenko & Sternberg, 2003). Aggression has been one of the main behaviors studied to understand how genes and the environment interact. In social psychology, aggression is usually defined as behavior intended to harm another person who wants to avoid that harm (Allen & Anderson, 2017). The hereditary basis of aggression, however, remains poorly understood. Aggression is a multi-dimensional concept, but it can be generally defined as behavior that inflicts pain or harm on another.

The genetic-developmental theory states that individual differences in a continuous phenotype result from the action of a large number of genes, each exerting an effect that works with environmental factors to produce the trait. This type of trait is influenced by multiple factors making it more complex and difficult to study than a simple Mendelian trait (one gene for one phenotype).

== History ==
Past thoughts on genetic factors influencing aggression, specifically in regard to sex chromosomes, tended to seek answers from chromosomal abnormalities. Four decades ago, the XYY genotype was (erroneously) believed by many to be correlated with aggression. This idea began after early chromosome studies suggested that men with an extra Y chromosome might be more prone to violent behavior. In 1965 and 1966, researchers at the MRC Clinical & Population Cytogenetics Research Unit led by Dr. Court Brown at Western General Hospital in Edinburgh reported finding a much higher than expected nine XYY men (2.9%) averaging almost 6ft. tall in a survey of 314 patients at the State Hospital for Scotland; seven of the nine XYY patients were intellectually disabled. In their initial reports published before examining the XYY patients, the researchers suggested they might have been hospitalized because of aggressive behavior. When the XYY patients were examined, the researchers found their assumptions of aggressive behavior were incorrect. Unfortunately, many science and medicine textbooks quickly and uncritically incorporated the initial, incorrect assumptions about XYY and aggression—including psychology textbooks on aggression.

The XYY genotype first gained wide notoriety in 1968 when it was raised as a part of a defense in two murder trials in Australia and France. In the United States, five attempts to use the XYY genotype as a defense were unsuccessful—in only one case in 1969 was it allowed to go to a jury—which rejected it. These court cases helped spread the false ideas that having an extra Y chromosome made some people more violent, but later studies found no evidence for it.

Results from several decades of long-term follow-up of scores of unselected XYY males identified in eight international newborn chromosome screening studies in the 1960s and 1970s have replaced pioneering but biased studies from the 1960s (that used only institutionalized XYY men), as the basis for current understanding of the XYY genotype and established that XYY males are characterized by increased height but are not characterized by aggressive behavior. Though the link currently between genetics and aggression has turned to an aspect of genetics different from chromosomal abnormalities, it is important to understand where the research started and the direction it is moving in today.

== Heritability ==
As with other topics in behavioral genetics, aggression is studied in three main experimental ways to help identify what role genetics plays in the behavior:

- Heritability studies – studies focused to determine whether a trait, such as aggression, is heritable and how it is inherited from parent to offspring. These studies make use of genetic linkage maps to identify genes associated with certain behaviors such as aggression.
- Mechanism experiments – studies to determine the biological mechanisms that lead certain genes to influence types of behavior like aggression.
- Genetic behavior correlation studies – studies that use scientific data and attempt to correlate it with actual human behavior. Examples include twin studies and adoption studies.

These three main experimental types are used in animal studies, studies testing heritability and molecular genetics, and gene/environment interaction studies. For example, researchers may use mice and rats to better understand how certain genes are linked to aggressive behavior and how these traits show up in people in different situations. Recently, important links between aggression and genetics have been studied and the results are allowing scientists to better understand the connections. Even though things like how someone is raised and their environment matter a lot, more research shows that genetics play an important role in behavior.

=== Selective breeding ===
The heritability of aggression has been observed in many animal strains after noting that some strains of birds, dogs, fish, and mice seem to be more aggressive than other strains. Selective breeding has demonstrated that it is possible to select for genes that lead to more aggressive behavior in animals. Selective breeding examples also allow researchers to understand the importance of developmental timing for genetic influences on aggressive behavior. A study done in 1983 (Cairns) produced both highly aggressive male and female strains of mice dependent on certain developmental periods to have this more aggressive behavior expressed. These mice were not observed to be more aggressive during the early and later stages of their lives, but during certain periods of time (in their middle-age period) were more violent and aggressive in their attacks on other mice. In another study, mice selectively bred for aggressive behavior showed differences in attack behavior and neurochemical levels in the brain compared to non-aggressive strain. This demonstrates how aggression related traits can be genetically inherited and expressed under specific experimental conditions. Selective breeding is a quick way to select for specific traits and see those selected traits within a few generations of breeding. These characteristics make selective breeding an important tool in the study of genetics and aggressive behavior.

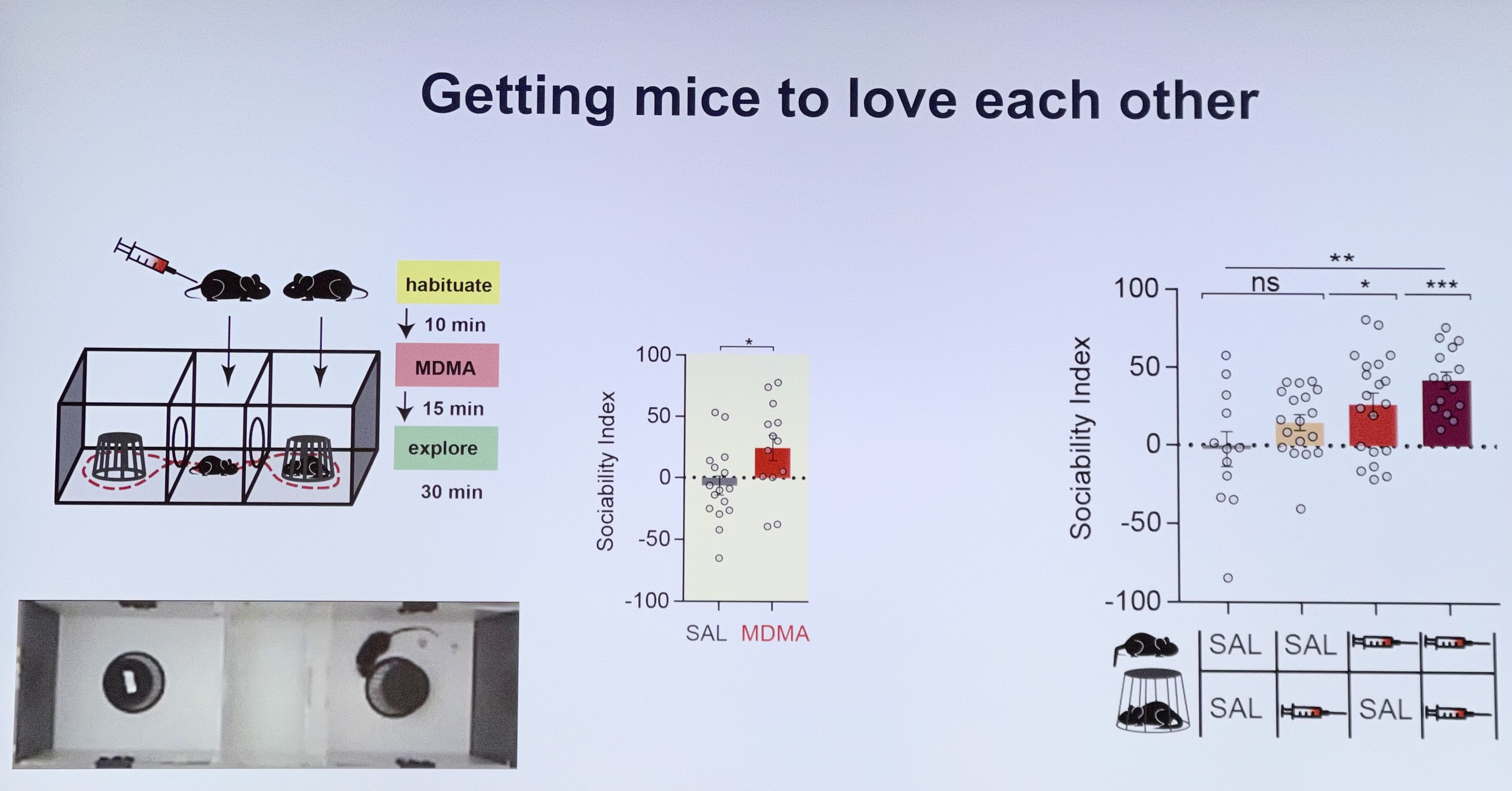
Making Mouse Mates with MDMA

=== Mouse studies ===
Mice are often used as a model for human genetic behavior since mice and humans have homologous genes coding for homologous proteins that are used for similar functions at some biological levels. Mice aggression studies have led to some interesting insight in human aggression. Using reverse genetics, the DNA of genes for the receptors of many neurotransmitters have been cloned and sequenced, and the role of neurotransmitters in rodent aggression has been investigated using pharmacological manipulations. Serotonin has been identified in the offensive attack by male mice against intruder male mice. Mutants were made by manipulating a receptor for serotonin by deleting a gene for the serotonin receptor. These mutant male mice with the knockout alleles exhibited normal behavior in everyday activities such as eating and exploration, but when prompted, attacked intruders with twice the intensity of normal male mice. In offense aggression in mice, males with the same or similar genotypes were more likely to fight than males that encountered males of other genotypes. Another interesting finding in mice dealt with mice reared alone. These mice showed a strong tendency to attack other male mice upon their first exposure to the other animals. The mice reared alone were not taught to be more aggressive; they simply exhibited the behavior. This implicates the natural tendency related to biological aggression in mice since the mice reared alone lacked a parent to model aggressive behavior.

Oxidative stress arises as a result of excess production of reactive oxygen species in relation to defense mechanisms, including the action of antioxidants such as superoxide dismutase 1 (SOD1). Knockout of the Sod1 gene was experimentally introduced in male mice leading to impaired antioxidant defense. These mice were designated (Sod1-/-). The Sod1-/- male mice proved to be more aggressive than both heterozygous knockout males (Sod1+/-) that were 50% deficient in SOD1, and wild-type males (Sod1+/+).^{[14]} The basis for the association of oxidative stress with increased aggression has not yet been determined.

Further evidence supporting the genetic basis of aggression in mice comes from knockout studies targeting serotonin pathways. In particular, mice lacking the Tph2 gene, which is critical for brain specific serotonin synthesis, exhibited significantly elevated aggression in resident intruder tests, with up to seven times more attacks compared to wild type mice. These mice also showed reduced anxiety like behaviors in standard behavioral assays such as the elevated plus maze and novelty suppressed feeding test. This results provides strong evidence that central serotonin deficiency directly contributes to aggressive behavior.

=== Drosophila studies ===
As with most insects, aggressive behaviors between male flies commonly occur in the presence of courting a female and when competing for resources. Such behaviors often involve raising wings and legs towards the opponent and attacking with the whole body. Thus, it often causes wing damage, which reduces their fitness by removing their ability to fly and mate.

In order for aggression to occur, male flies produce sounds to communicate their intent. A 2017 study found that songs promoting aggression contain pulses occurring at longer intervals. RNA sequencing from fly mutants displaying over-aggressive behaviors found more than 50 auditory-related genes (important for transient receptor potentials, Ca^{2+} signaling, and mechanoreceptor potentials) to be upregulated in the AB neurons located in Johnston's organ. In addition, aggression levels were reduced when these genes were knocked out via RNA interference. This signifies the major role of hearing as a sensory modality in communicating aggression.

Other than hearing, another sensory modality that regulates aggression is pheromone signaling, which operates through either the olfactory system or the gustatory system depending on the pheromone. An example is cVA, an anti-aphrodisiac pheromone used by males to mark females after copulation and to deter other males from mating. This male-specific pheromone causes an increase in male-male aggression when detected by another male's gustatory system. However, upon inserting a mutation that makes the flies irresponsive to cVA, no aggressive behaviors were seen. This shows how there are multiple modalities for promoting aggression in flies.

Specifically, when competing for food, aggression occurs based on amount of food available and is independent of any social interactions between males. Specifically, sucrose was found to stimulate gustatory receptor neurons, which was necessary to stimulate aggression. However, once the amount of food becomes greater than a certain amount, the competition between males lowers. This is possibly due to an over-abundance of food resources. On a larger scale, food was found to determine the boundaries of a territory since flies were observed to be more aggressive at the food's physical perimeter.

However, like most behaviors requiring arousal and wakefulness, aggression was found to be impaired via sleep deprivation. Specifically, this occurs through the impairment of Octopamine and dopamine signaling, which are important pathways for regulating arousal in insects. Due to reduced aggression, sleep-deprived male flies were found to be disadvantaged at mating compared to normal flies. However, when octopamine agonists were administered upon these sleep-deprived flies, aggression levels were seen to be increased and sexual fitness was subsequently restored. Therefore, this finding implicates the importance of sleep in aggression between male flies.

Oxidative stress arises as a result of excess production of reactive oxygen species in relation to defense mechanisms, including the action of antioxidants such as superoxide dismutase 1 (SOD1). Knockout of the Sod1 gene was experimentally introduced in male mice leading to impaired antioxidant defense. These mice were designated (Sod1-/-). The Sod1-/- male mice proved to be more aggressive than both heterozygous knockout males (Sod1+/-) that were 50% deficient in SOD1, and wild-type males (Sod1+/+). The basis for the association of oxidative stress with increased aggression has not yet been determined.

== Biological mechanisms ==
Experiments designed to study biological mechanisms are utilized when exploring how aggression is influenced by genetics. Molecular genetics studies allow many different types of behavioral traits to be examined by manipulating genes and studying the effect(s) of the manipulation.

=== Molecular genetics ===
A number of molecular genetics studies have focused on manipulating candidate aggression genes in mice and other animals to induce effects that can be possibly applied to humans. Most studies have focused on polymorphisms of serotonin receptors, dopamine receptors, and neurotransmitter metabolizing enzymes. Results of these studies have led to linkage analysis to map the serotonin-related genes and impulsive aggression, as well as dopamin-related genes and proactive aggression. In particular, the serotonin 5-HT seems to be an influence in inter-male aggression either directly or through other molecules that use the 5-HT pathway. 5-HT normally dampens aggression in animals and humans. Mice missing specific genes for 5-HT were observed to be more aggressive than normal mice and were more rapid and violent in their attacks. Other studies have been focused on neurotransmitters. Studies of a mutation in the neurotransmitter metabolizing enzyme monoamine oxidase A (MAO-A) have been shown to cause a syndrome that includes violence and impulsivity in humans. Studies of the molecular genetics pathways are leading to the production of pharmaceuticals to fix the pathway problems and hopefully show an observed change in aggressive behavior.

A clear example of molecular genetics in aggression research involves manipulation of the Tph2 gene, which encodes tryptophan hydroxylase 2, the enzyme critical for brain serotonin synthesis. In a mouse model developed by, Tph2 knockout mice exhibited almost complete central serotonin depletion and showed exaggerated aggressive behavior during resident intruder tests. This study directly links a single gene mutation to molecular and behavioral outcomes, demonstrating the causal role of serotonergic pathways in aggression regulation at the molecular level.

== Human behavior genetics ==
In determining if a trait is related to genetic factors or environmental factors, twin studies and adoption studies are used. These studies examine correlations based on similarity of a trait and a person's genetic or environmental factors that could influence the trait. Aggression has been examined via both twin studies and adoption studies. The human genetics related to aggression have been studied and the main genes have been identified. The DAT1 and DRD2 genes are heavily related to the genetics of aggression, along with COMT, AVPR1A, and SLC6A4. The DAT1 gene plays a role for its heavy relation to regulation of neurotransmission. The DRD2 Gene results in humans finding seemingly rewarding paths such as drug abuse. Through studies, DRD2 seems to be a risk factor in delinquency when children have related family trauma events. The COMT gene is responsible for making catechol-o-methyltransferase, which plays a role in hormone regulation and certain processes that take place in the prefrontal cortex (COMT gene: MedlinePlus Genetics). AVPR1A is an active gene in several different species, but has been researched more commonly in rats. Its expression, or lack thereof, is directly associated with social behavior and interaction. The SLC6A4 gene that regulates serotonin uptake, which is directly related to personality and mood. Mutations of this gene can also cause certain antidepressants, SSRI’s, to gain or lose function.

DAT1 is a gene that regulates dopamine levels in the brain. This study revealed that variations in the DAT1 gene were correlated with higher levels of aggression. Some people that have variations of the DAT1 gene exhibit more aggressive behaviors. DAT2 controls how the brain responds to dopamine. Certain combinations of DAT1 and DAT2 genes were linked to an increase or decrease in aggressive behaviors. While the relationship remains unclear, there is certainly a correlation between certain forms of DAT1 and DAT2 and varying combinations of each. Changes in these genes can cause changes in neurotransmitter levels. When typical neurotransmitter levels change, other bodily behaviors are also affected. Examples of other functions that are impacted are intelligence, mood, and memory. There are a few different types of study that are commonly performed to help understand how certain aspects of aggressive behavior are developed, inherited, or both. Two common ones are twin and adoption studies, which are often set up in tandem to investigate differences in biological and environmental influence.

=== Twin studies ===
Twin studies are studies typically conducted comparing identical and fraternal twins. They aim to reveal the importance of environmental and genetic influences for traits, phenotypes, and disorders. Before the advancement of molecular genetics, twin studies were almost the only mode of investigation of genetic influences on personality. Heritability was estimated as twice the difference between the correlation for identical, or monozygotic, twins and that for fraternal, or dizygotic, twins. Early studies indicated that personality was fifty percent genetic. Current thinking holds that each individual picks and chooses from a range of stimuli and events largely on the basis of their genotype creating a unique set of experiences; basically meaning that people create their own environments. It has been determined that there is a window in childhood that certain trauma events can trigger a lifetime of aggressive behavior.

=== Adoption studies ===
Adoption studies are a specific research designs that involve comparing traits between an adopted child and their biological and adoptive parents. These experiments aim to assess both biological and environmental factors that may be attributed to aggression. Adoption studies have shown stronger similarities between adopted children and their biological parents, indicating that there is a genetic component at play. However, children have also shown similarities with their adoptive parents, indicating that there are environmental factors as well. These studies further support the complex nature of aggression by proving that there are both biological and environmental factors involved. More research needs to be conducted to truly prove the causes of aggression.

At the University of Colorado in 1997, two researchers compiled a series of twin and adoption studies to investigate the relationship, if any, between heritability and environmental factors on aggressive behavior. All of the studies concluded that environment and genetics both play a complex role in the development of aggression, but their influence varies. Genetics generally has a substantial influence through childhood into adulthood across the board, but environmental and familial influence decreases with age. They also compared males and females, which shows that genetics have a larger impact on males, and the environment is more influential for females.

=== Genetics of aggression over time ===
Over time, studies pertaining to the genetics of aggression have improved, and become an interesting research topic for those looking for research opportunities. Experiments started in 1963 with the Milgram's experiment. The results of this experiment proved that in certain situations, people can be coaxed into aggression and violence. The next big experiment pertaining to the genetics of aggression took place in 1973 as part of the Stanford prison experiment. The conclusion drawn from this experiment was that in many cases, aggression is very unexpected at certain points. It was considered to be "elicited." This also revealed that aggression is often triggered in situations where someone feels an ideology that they hold a very powerful authority over someone else. It was concluded from both experiments that social aspects prove to be a big factor in the way people act aggressively. It was also concluded that every person has a potential to express aggressive behavior, but what is different between people is the extent of the point it takes to reach that output.

=== Male vs female aggression ===
Aggression can manifest in different ways between biological males and females. A study evaluated these differences by using EEG and ECG to monitor neurobiological responses to aggravating stimuli. It was shown that anger and physical aggression was much greater in men than women. Men also scored higher on a scale regarding reactive aggression. The EEG test also supported the idea that women show weaker responses regarding aggression. It was also shown that men and women follow different pathways in the brain when aggression is invoked, although further studies are needed in order to solidify these findings.

== Environmental factors ==
Aggression can have many causes, including environmental factors. Environmental factors include any physical, chemical, and biological environmental factors that can influence aggression. Studies have shown that neighborhood greenspace can vastly reduce aggressive behaviors in children and adolescents. One proposed explanation for this finding is that greenspace has been proven to reduce stress and depression. Higher stress and depression levels in parents have been shown to increase aggressive behaviors in children. By lowering stress and depression in parents, children are more likely to show a decrease in aggressive behaviors. In addition, greenspace promotes participation in physical activity and social involvement. Another study revealed that low-frequency, high-intensity, and continuous noises were associated with more aggressive behaviors.

== See also ==
- Anthropological criminology
- Behavioural genetics
- Seville Statement
