= Prostanoic acid =

- Prostanoic Acid

Names
- Preferred IUPAC name 7-[(1S,2S)-2-Octylcyclopentyl]heptanoic acid

Identifiers
CAS Number	25151-81-9
3D model (JSmol)	Interactive image
ChEBI	CHEBI:8504
ChemSpider	388714
PubChem CID	439642
CompTox Dashboard (EPA)	DTXSID00331427
- InChI: InChI=1S/C20H38O2/c1-2-3-4-5-6-9-13-18-15-12-16-19(18)14-10-7-8-11-17-20(21)22/h18-19H,2-17H2,1H3,(H,21,22)/t18-,19-/m0/s1 Key: WGJJROVFWIXTPA-OALUTQOASA-N
- SMILES: CCCCCCCCC1CCCC1CCCCCCC(=O)O

Properties
Chemical formula	C_{20}H_{38}O_{2}
Molar mass	310.522 g·mol^{−1}
- Except where otherwise noted, data are given for materials in their standard state (at 25 °C [77 °F], 100 kPa). Infobox references

Prostanoic acid (7-[(1S,2S)-2-octylcyclopentyl]heptanoic acid) is a saturated fatty acid that contains a cyclopentane ring. Its derivatives are prostaglandins - physiologically active lipid substances. Prostanoic acid is not found in nature, but it can be synthesized in vitro.

== Synthesis ==
For the first time, the synthesis of prostanoic acid from 1-formylcyclopentene was considered in detail in the scientific literature in 1975 by a group of French pharmacists. One year later, a group of Japanese scientists, who worked in the central research laboratory of the "Sankyo Co., Ltd." company (Shinagawa, Tokyo), published another method for obtaining prostanoic acid from 2-[4-hydroxy-5-(methoxymethyl)cyclopent-2-en-1-yl] acetic acid. In 1986, a group of Japanese scientists from Kyushu University in Fukuoka proposed their own scheme for obtaining prostanoic acid from limonene.

== See also ==
- Prostaglandin
- Saturated fat
- Fatty acid
- Fatty acid synthesis
- List of saturated fatty acids
- List of unsaturated fatty acids
