= Omega-7 =

Omega-7 may refer to:

- Omega 7, a Cuban paramilitary group
- Omega-7 fatty acid, a class of fatty acids
