= Sea buckthorn oil =

Vegetable oil

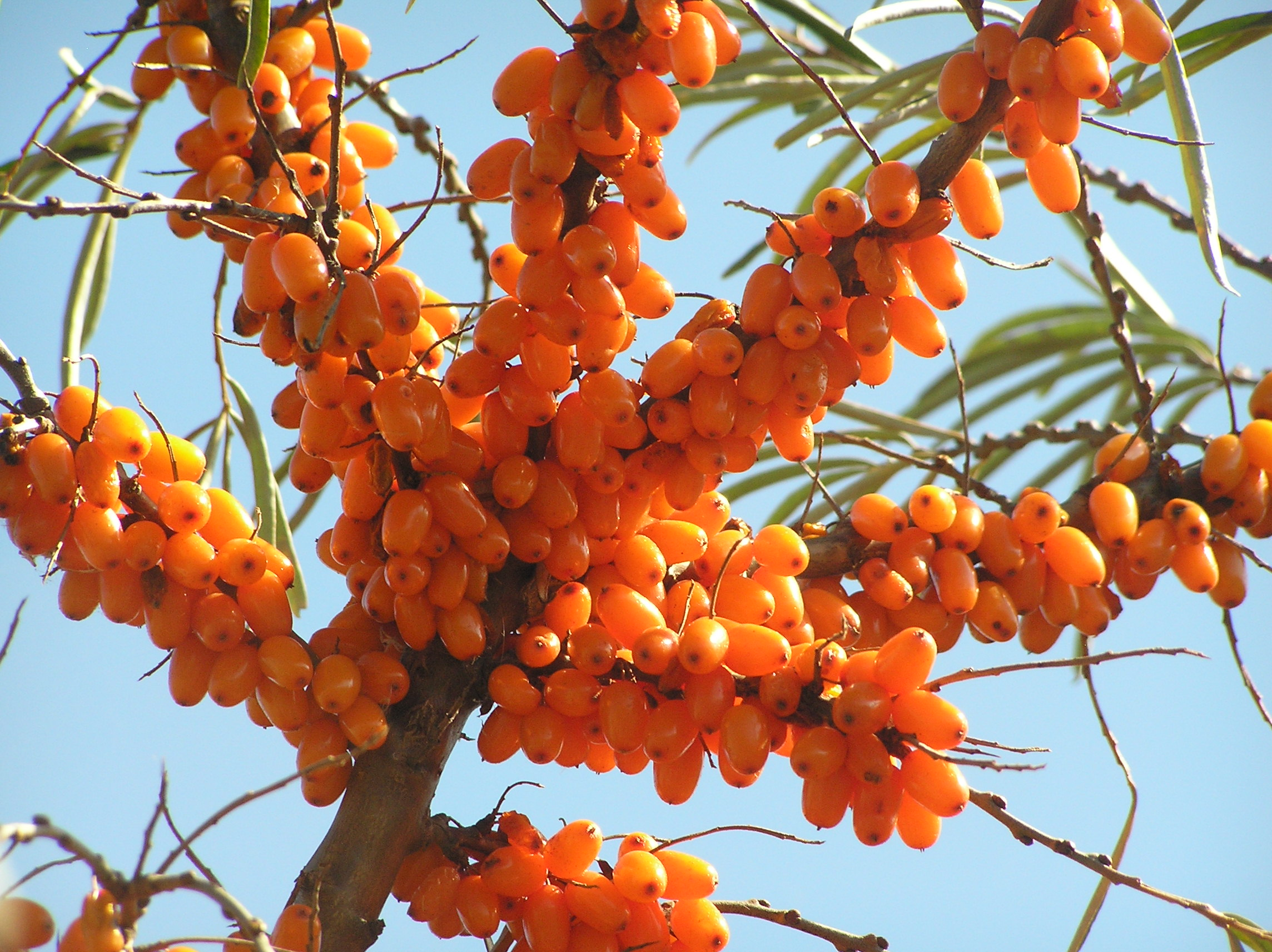
Sea buckthorn berries

Sea buckthorn oil is a red-orange oil derived from sea buckthorn plants. The most commonly used species for this purpose is Hippophae rhamnoides. Species belonging to this genus accumulate lipids in the mesocarp (the fruit pulp), so the oil can be extracted from either the seeds or the pulp.

The resulting oils (seed oil and pulp oil, also called fruit or berry oil) are used in dietary supplements, nutraceuticals, cosmetics and skin care products.

== Chemical constituents ==
Oil content in seeds of sea buckthorn is on average 7–11% while oil content of the fruit pulp is around 1.5–3% (per fresh weight).

Seed oil is characterized by high contents of polyunsaturated fatty acids while pulp oil contains monounsaturated fatty acids and carotenoids. Both oils also contain dense amounts of tocopherols, tocotrienols and plant sterols.

=== Fatty acids ===
Oils from sea buckthorn seeds and fruit pulp differ considerably in fatty acid composition. While linoleic acid and α-linolenic acid are the major fatty acids in seed oil, sea buckthorn pulp oil contains approximately 65% combined of the omega-7 monounsaturated fatty acid, palmitoleic acid, and the saturated fatty acid, palmitic acid. This results in a major difference between the sea buckthorn oil extracted from seeds and the sea buckthorn oil extracted from the fleshy part of the fruit, in term of appearance and consistency. Sea buckthorn fruit oil is dark orange in color and has a thick consistency (it is liquid at room temperature, but becomes much thicker if refrigerated), whereas the seed oil is pale yellow and does not solidify under refrigeration.

Few other vegetable oils contain a similar quantity of these fatty acids. The high proportion of unsaturated fatty acids are also responsible for the relatively poor shelf life, as they cause sea buckthorn oil to turn rancid quickly.

=== Tocopherols and tocotrienols ===
α-Tocopherol is the major vitamin E compound in sea buckthorn. Seed oil also contains considerable amounts of gamma-tocopherol. The total amount of tocopherols and tocotrienols is roughly 64–300 mg/100 g in seed oil and 100–481 mg/100 g in pulp oil.

=== Carotenoids ===
As carotenoids are the pigments that give sea buckthorn berry its distinctive orange-red color, these compounds are present in considerable amounts both in pulp oil and in seed oil; the average carotenoid content of pulp oil is 350 mg per 100 grams, as compared to 67.5 mg per 100 grams in seed oil. The total content of carotenoids in pulp oil varies greatly (300–2000 mg/100 g) between different growth locations and subspecies, and between components, where total carotenoids were up to 85 mg/100 g in seed oil, and up to 1000 mg/100 g in pulp oil. In general, the main carotenoids present in pulp oil are beta-carotene, zeaxanthin and lycopene.

=== Plant sterols ===
Both seed and pulp oil also contain considerable amounts of plant sterols (12–23 g/kg and 10–29 g/kg of oil, respectively). Beta-sitosterol is the major sterol compound throughout the berry which constitutes 57–83% of total sterols.

== Uses ==
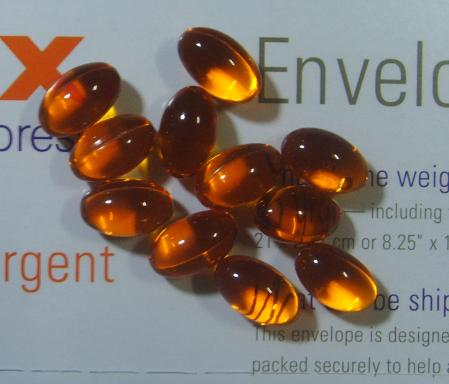
Sea buckthorn seed oil in capsules

Sea buckthorn oil is frequently used in cosmetic products, especially topical products marketed for aging skin and dry skin. Sea buckthorn oil is used in some shampoos and other hair care products.

It has sometimes been used as a type of topical medication for skin disorders, although there is no high-quality research proving effectiveness or safety of any such uses. Taking sea buckthorn oil as a dietary supplement does not help with eczema.

It has been used in Asian and Russian traditional medicine for centuries. In a few East Asian countries, the fruit pulp oil is put on skin burns.

== Research ==
Preliminary research on sea buckthorn oil has been conducted for its potential biological properties, but, as of 2022, there is no high-quality evidence it has any confirmed clinical uses.
