= Animal fat =

Fats and oils which are derived from animals

Lard
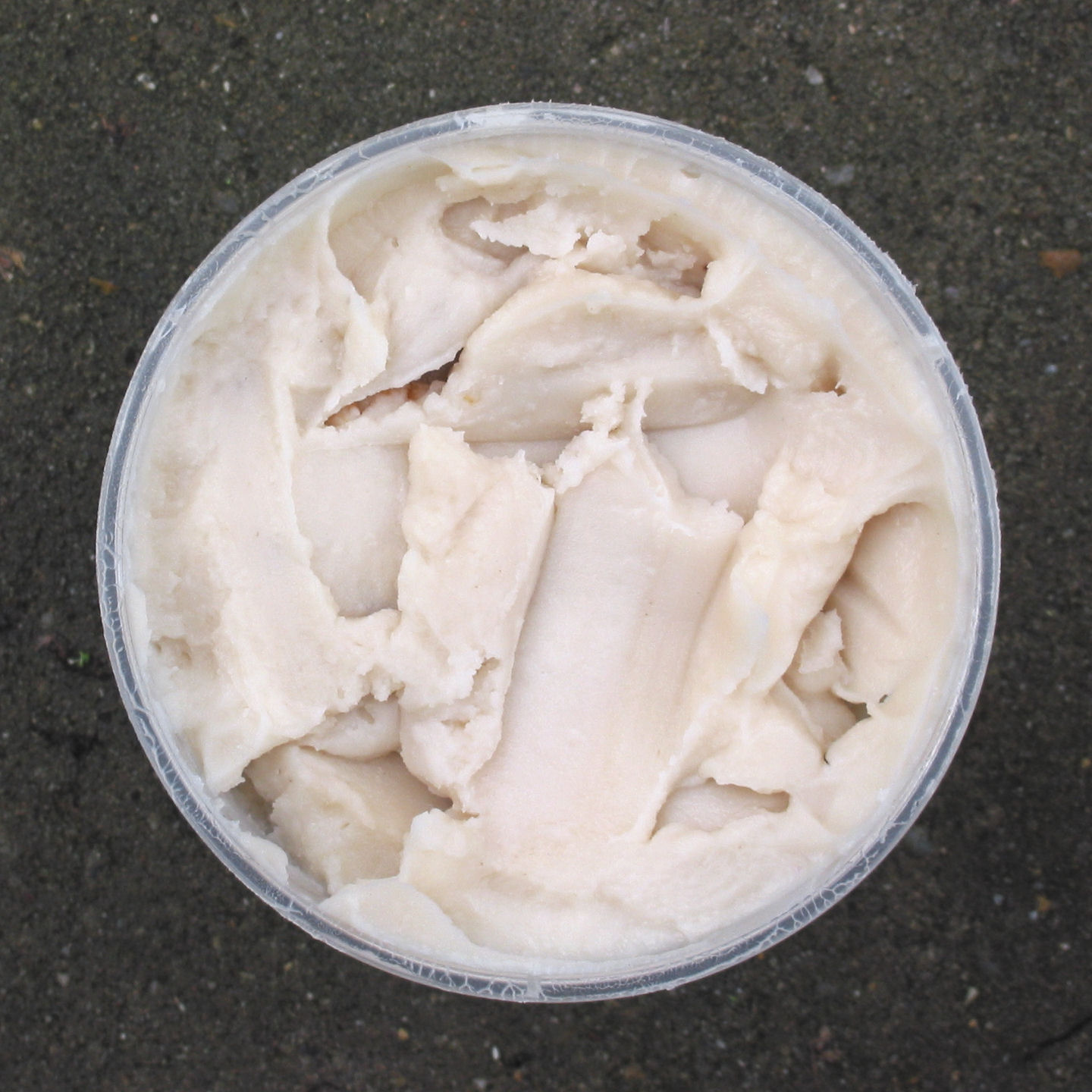
- Wet-rendered lard, from pork fatback.

Fat composition

Saturated fats
- Total saturated: 38–43%: Palmitic acid: 25–28% Stearic acid: 12–14% Myristic acid: 1%

Unsaturated fats
- Total unsaturated: 56–62%
- Monounsaturated: 47–50%: Oleic acid: 44–47% Palmitoleic acid: 3%
- Polyunsaturated: Linoleic acid: 6–10%

Properties
- Food energy per 100 g (3.5 oz): 3,770 kJ (900 kcal)
- Melting point: backfat: 30–40 °C (86–104 °F) leaf fat: 43–48 °C (109–118 °F) mixed fat: 36–45 °C (97–113 °F)
- Smoke point: 121–218 °C (250–424 °F)
- Specific gravity at 20 °C (68 °F): 0.917–0.938
- Iodine value: 45–75
- Acid value: 3.4
- Saponification value: 190–205
- Unsaponifiable: 0.8%

Animal fats are lipids derived from animals which are used by the animal for a multitude of functions, or can be used by humans for dietary, sanitary, and cosmetic purposes. Depending on the temperature of the fat, it can change between a solid state and a liquid (oil) state. Chemically, both fats and oils are composed of triglycerides. Although many animal parts and secretions may yield oil, in commercial practice, oil is extracted primarily from rendered tissue fats from livestock animals like pigs, chickens and cows. Dairy products yield animal fat and oil products such as butter.

== Chemical structure ==
Animal fats are composed of triglycerides, which are a type of ester molecule in which glycerol is bonded to three fatty acids. The three fatty acids that bond to the glycerol will determine the complexity and type of the triglyceride. If the three fatty acids are the same, then the triglyceride will be considered a simple triglyceride. However, most triglycerides contain differing fatty acids, causing them to have differing characteristics. Animal fat is a combination of many different triglycerides. Fatty acids can be broken down into two categories, saturated and unsaturated fats. Most animal fats are saturated fats.

== In animals ==
Fat serves many purposes within an animal's body. Some of these include insulating the body to regulate internal body temperature, serving as an energy reserve, and cushioning the feet. Many mammalian animals that live in cold regions of the globe, including both aquatic and terrestrial ecosystems, have developed a thick layer of fat just below the skin called blubber. This blubber helps these animals to reduce the amount of heat that is lost to the colder outside environment. Fat is a poor conductor of heat; therefore, it allows the heat that the animal produces to remain in their body for a longer period of time. Fat is also used by animals for the storage of energy. The type of fat that is used for energy storage is known as adipose tissue. This adipose tissue is made up adipocytes which store the energy in the chemical bonds of triglycerides. For example, prior to an animal going through hibernation, an animal will build up large reserves of adipocytes to ensure it has the energy to survive the long slumber. Fat is also used by animals to create foot pads. These foot pads aid in the longevity and health of the animal by absorbing the impacts that occur when the animal walks, runs, or jumps. These foot pads are present in many animals including cats, dogs, horses, and even larger mammals like elephants.

== Uses ==
Yearly per capita supply of raw animal fats

=== Food ===
Many animal fats and oils are consumed directly, or indirectly as ingredients in food. Animal fats are commonly consumed as part of a western diet in their semi-solid form as milk, butter, lard, schmaltz, and dripping or more commonly as filler in factory-produced meat, and fast-food products. Certain fats, such as goose fat, have a higher smoke point than other animal fats, but are still lower than many vegetable oils such as olive or avocado.

The oils serve a number of purposes in this role:

- Shortening – to give pastry a crumbly texture.
- Texture – oils can serve to make other ingredients stick together less.
- Flavor – some may be chosen specifically for the flavor they impart.
- Flavor base – oils can also "carry" flavors of other ingredients, since many flavors are present in chemicals that are soluble in oil.

Secondly, oils can be heated and used to cook foods. Suitability for this purpose depends on flash point.

=== Other uses ===
There are many other human uses for animal fat, a few of which come from tallow. One of the uses of tallow is the production of soap through a process called saponification. The tallow is boiled or heated along with lye, resulting in the production of a rough soap as well as glycerol. The soap is then put through a purification process until it becomes a usable sanitary product. Tallow is also used in the production of many skincare and cosmetic products. Tallow contains vitamins E, D, K, and A as well as conjugated linoleic acid which have all been shown to have benefits to skin health.

Raw animal oil derived from bones and other parts of animal carcasses used to be called oleum animale foetidum crudum or neatsfoot oil.

== See also ==
- Vegetable fats and oils
- Kitchen rendering
- Triglyceride
- Suet
- Tallow
- Ghee
