= Hypogeic acid =

Names
- IUPAC name (Z)-Hexadec-7-enoic acid
- Other names cis-7-Hexadecenoic acid

Identifiers
CAS Number	2416-19-5
3D model (JSmol)	Interactive image
ChemSpider	4476987
PubChem CID	5318393
UNII	111
CompTox Dashboard (EPA)	DTXSID301009353
- InChI: InChI=1S/C16H30O2/c1-2-3-4-5-6-7-8-9-10-11-12-13-14-15-16(17)18/h9-10H,2-8,11-15H2,1H3,(H,17,18)/b10-9- Key: PJHOFUXBXJNUAC-KTKRTIGZSA-N
- SMILES: CCCCCCCC/C=C\CCCCCC(=O)O

Properties
Chemical formula	C_{16}H_{30}O_{2}
Molar mass	254.414 g·mol^{−1}
Appearance	Colorless needles
Melting point	33 °C (91 °F; 306 K)
- Except where otherwise noted, data are given for materials in their standard state (at 25 °C [77 °F], 100 kPa). Infobox references

Hypogeic acid is a monounsaturated fatty acid of the omega-9 group. Its chemical formula is C_{16}H_{30}O_{2}, and its delta notation is 16:1Δ7c. The acid is composed of 16 carbon atoms, with one double bond in position 7=8 in cis-configuration. The compound has the structural formula CH_{3}-(CH_{2})_{7}-CH=CH-(CH_{2})_{5}-COOH.

Hypogeic acid is found in Monascus purpureus and Arachis hypogaea. The compound can also be isolated from autotrophic bacterial cultures associated with the accumulation of sulfate in biofilters.

== Discovery ==
The acid was initially found by Gössmann and Scheven in 1854–1855, together with palmitic and arachidic acids in earth-nut oil that was used as a substitute for olive oil.

== Physical properties ==
Hypogeic acid is soluble in alcohol and forms colorless needle-like crystals.
