= Omega−7 fatty acid =

Class of unsaturated fatty acids

Omega−7 fatty acids (also referred to as ω−7 fatty acids or n−7 fatty acids) are a class of unsaturated fatty acids in which the site of unsaturation is seven carbon atoms from the end of the carbon chain.

== Overview ==
The two most common omega−7 fatty acids in nature are palmitoleic acid and vaccenic acid. They are widely used in cosmetics due to their moisturizing properties. Omega−7 fats are not essential fatty acids in humans as they can be made endogenously.

Rich sources include macadamia nut oil and sea buckthorn (berry) oil in the form of palmitoleic acid, while dairy products are the primary sources of vaccenic acid and rumenic acid. A lesser but useful source of palmitoleic acid is avocado fruit (25,000ppm).

The monounsaturated omega−7 fatty acids have the general chemical structure CH_{3}-(CH_{2})_{5}-CH=CH-(CH_{2})_{n}-CO_{2}H.

Common name	Lipid name	Chemical name
none	12:1 (n−7)	5-Dodecenoic acid
none	14:1 (n−7)	7-Tetradecenoic acid
Palmitoleic acid	16:1 (n−7)	9-Hexadecenoic acid
Vaccenic acid	18:1 (n−7)	11-Octadecenoic acid
Rumenic acid	18:2 (n−7)	Octadeca-9,11-dienoic acid
Paullinic acid	20:1 (n−7)	13-Eicosenoic acid
none	22:1 (n−7)	15-Docosenoic acid
none	24:1 (n−7)	17-Tetracosenoic acid

== Metabolism ==
16- and 18-carbon omega−7 unsaturated fatty acids are known to be converted into 18- or 20-carbon highly unsaturated fatty acids in the body by nonselective desaturating enzymes. The same enzymes also act on omega−3, omega−6, and omega−9 fatty acids. As a result, while proportions of individual highly unsaturated fatty acids may vary greatly in different tissue types due to factors such as diet, the overall concentration of highly unsaturated fatty acids is kept stable in a living organism. These individual concentrations are highly influential in determining what fatty acids will be used by a given tissue type in phospholipid synthesis such as that required for the maintenance of the cellular membrane.

== Research ==
=== Diabetes ===
Omega−7 fatty acids, especially palmitoleic acid, have been shown in vitro to decrease glucose-sensitive apoptosis in beta cells in the pancreas, a condition associated with diabetes. In adult organisms, new beta cells are most commonly the result of replication rather than from direct stem cell differentiation, meaning that preventing apoptosis of beta cells is crucial for maintaining a stable population of beta cells. The cytoprotective effect of omega−7 fatty acids makes them a candidate for diabetes treatment.

== Production ==
=== In cows ===
Dairy products are one of the primary sources of dietary omega−7 fatty acids. However, the production of omega−7 fatty acids in cows is heavily diet-dependent. Specifically, a reduction in the proportion of herbage consumed by a cow is correlated with a significant decrease in the omega−7 fatty acid content of the cow's milk. Rumenic and vaccenic acid concentrations declined significantly within one week of removing herbage from the cow's diet, suggesting that modern dairy farming methods may lead to decreases in beneficial fatty acid content of dairy products.

=== Algal extraction ===
Traditional sources of omega−7 fatty acids such as macadamia nuts have proved expensive on the industrial scale, prompting the discovery of new omega−7 rich sources such as algae. Alterations to algal growing conditions such as carbon dioxide or dipotassium phosphate enrichment have been shown to potentially bias algal biosynthesis towards lipids. Up to 90% of their dry weight may be harvested as lipids. In this process, raw algae is dewatered to yield algal oil. Algal oil gets degummed, typically via washing with acid, to removing polar lipids and metals. Degummed algal oil is then transesterified and purified to yield a mixture of omega−7 esters and eicosapentaenoic acids, which can be hydrodeoxygenated to form algae jet fuel and algae green diesel, respectively. These products are then crystallized and separated to yield the desired omega−7 fatty acid.

== See also ==
- Omega−3 fatty acid
- Omega−6 fatty acid
- Omega−9 fatty acid
