= Linolelaidic acid =

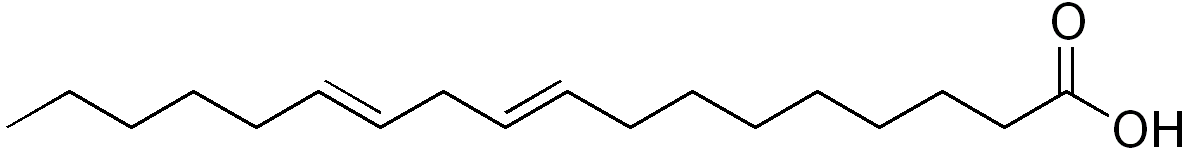

Names
- IUPAC name (9E,12E)-Octadeca-9,12-dienoic acid
- Other names trans,trans-9,12-Octadecadienoic acid, Linoelaidic acid

Identifiers
CAS Number	506-21-8
3D model (JSmol)	Interactive image
ChEMBL	ChEMBL93204
ChemSpider	4445609
PubChem CID	5282457
UNII	7552P0K6PN
CompTox Dashboard (EPA)	DTXSID50897508
- InChI: InChI=1S/C18H32O2/c1-2-3-4-5-6-7-8-9-10-11-12-13-14-15-16-17-18(19)20/h6-7,9-10H,2-5,8,11-17H2,1H3,(H,19,20)/b7-6+,10-9+ Key: OYHQOLUKZRVURQ-AVQMFFATSA-N; InChI=1/C18H32O2/c1-2-3-4-5-6-7-8-9-10-11-12-13-14-15-16-17-18(19)20/h6-7,9-10H,2-5,8,11-17H2,1H3,(H,19,20)/b7-6+,10-9+ Key: OYHQOLUKZRVURQ-AVQMFFATBA
- SMILES: O=C(O)CCCCCCC/C=C/C/C=C/CCCCC

Properties
Chemical formula	C_{18}H_{32}O_{2}
Molar mass	280.45 g/mol
Melting point	28–29 °C (82–84 °F; 301–302 K)
Boiling point	229 to 230 °C (444 to 446 °F; 502 to 503 K) at 16 mmHg
- Except where otherwise noted, data are given for materials in their standard state (at 25 °C [77 °F], 100 kPa). verify (what is ?) Infobox references

Linolelaidic acid is an omega-6 trans fatty acid (TFA) and is a cis–trans isomer of linoleic acid. It is found in partially hydrogenated vegetable oils. It is a white (or colourless) viscous liquid.

TFAs are classified as conjugated and nonconjugated, corresponding usually to the structural elements −CH=CH−CH=CH− and −CH=CH−CH_{2}−CH=CH−, respectively. Nonconjugated TFAs are represented by elaidic acid and linolelaidic acid. Their presence is linked heart diseases. The TFA vaccenic acid, which is of animal origin, poses less of a health risk.
