= Eicosenoic acid =

Eicosenoic acid may refer to one of three closely related chemical compounds:

- 9-Eicosenoic acid (gadoleic acid), an omega-11 fatty acid (20:1ω11)
- 11-Eicosenoic acid (gondoic acid), an omega-9 fatty acid (20:1ω9)
- 13-Eicosenoic acid (paullinic acid), an omega-7 fatty acid (20:1ω7)
