= Sapienic acid =

16-Carbon monounsaturated fatty acid

Names
- Preferred IUPAC name (6Z)-Hexadec-6-enoic acid
- Other names cis-6-Hexadecenoic acid 16:1ω10 16:1n10 (lipid numbers)

Identifiers
CAS Number	17004-51-2
3D model (JSmol)	Interactive image
ChEBI	CHEBI:76244
ChemSpider	4471844
KEGG	C21942
PubChem CID	5312419
UNII	6460S1EJ28
CompTox Dashboard (EPA)	DTXSID50904584
- InChI: InChI=1S/C16H30O2/c1-2-3-4-5-6-7-8-9-10-11-12-13-14-15-16(17)18/h10-11H,2-9,12-15H2,1H3,(H,17,18)/b11-10- Key: NNNVXFKZMRGJPM-KHPPLWFESA-N; InChI=1/C16H30O2/c1-2-3-4-5-6-7-8-9-10-11-12-13-14-15-16(17)18/h10-11H,2-9,12-15H2,1H3,(H,17,18)/b11-10- Key: NNNVXFKZMRGJPM-KHPPLWFEBD
- SMILES: O=C(O)CCCC\C=C/CCCCCCCCC

Properties
Chemical formula	C_{16}H_{30}O_{2}
Molar mass	254.414 g·mol^{−1}
- Except where otherwise noted, data are given for materials in their standard state (at 25 °C [77 °F], 100 kPa). verify (what is ?) Infobox references

Sapienic acid is a fatty acid that is a major component of human sebum. Unique to humans, it takes its scientific name from the root sapiens. The equivalent fatty acid in mouse sebum is palmitoleic acid. Sapienic acid salts, esters, anion, and conjugate base are known as sapienates.

Deficient production of sapienic acid has been implicated in the development of atopic dermatitis, and sapienic acid has potent antibacterial activity against pathogens like Staphylococcus aureus. Reduced omega-3 intake has been linked to lower sapienic acid levels in sebum.

Delta-6-desaturation of palmitic acid leads to the biosynthesis of sapienic acid. In other tissues linoleic acid is the target for delta 6 desaturase, but linoleic acid is degraded in sebaceous cells, allowing the enzyme to desaturate palmitic to sapienic acid. A two-carbon extension product of sapienic acid, sebaleic acid, is also present in sebum.

Decanal, which can be formed through the breakdown of sapienic acid, is likely what mosquitoes use to identify human prey.
