= Vaccenyl acetate =

11-cis-Vaccenyl acetate
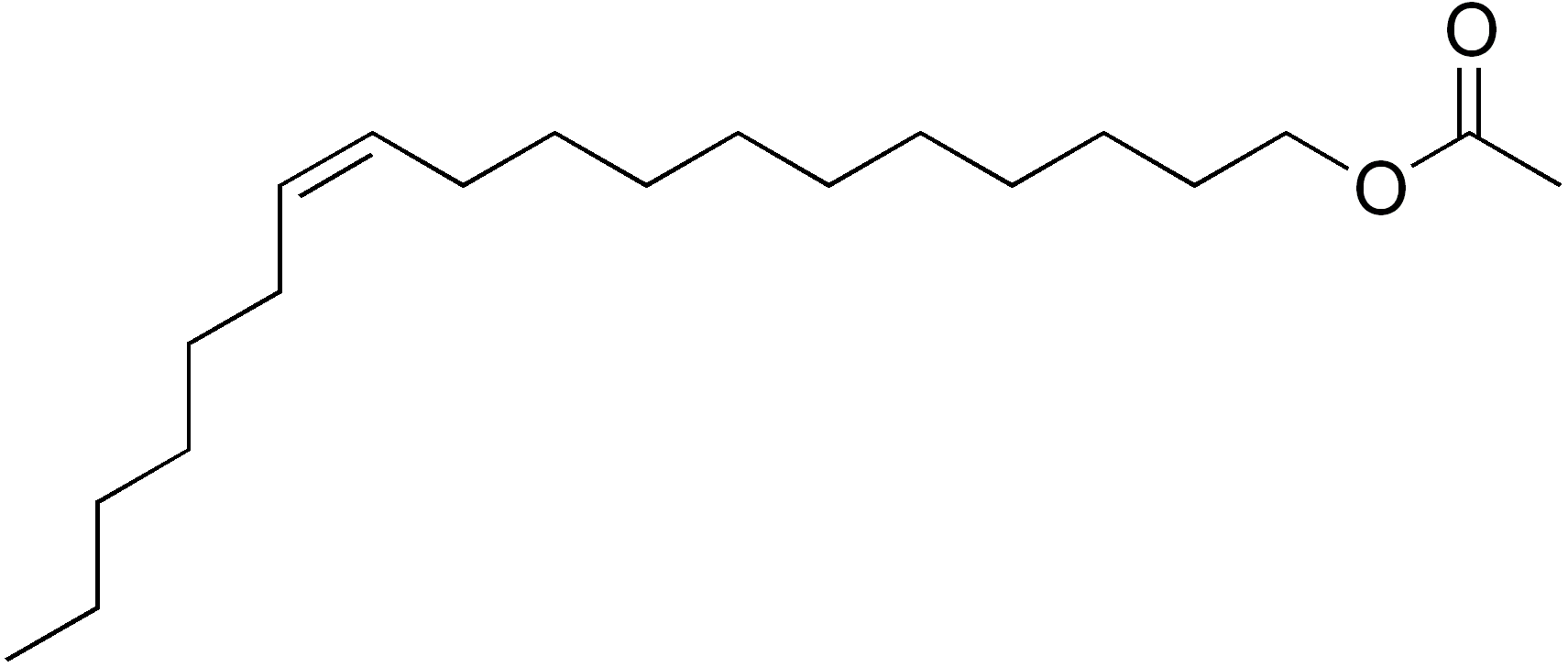

Names
- Preferred IUPAC name (11Z)-Octadec-11-en-1-yl acetate

Identifiers
CAS Number	6186-98-7
3D model (JSmol)	Interactive image
ChEBI	CHEBI:46274
ChemSpider	4515653
PubChem CID	5363286
UNII	49M29ZH9TS
CompTox Dashboard (EPA)	DTXSID401028467
- InChI: InChI=1S/C20H38O2/c1-3-4-5-6-7-8-9-10-11-12-13-14-15-16-17-18-19-22-20(2)21/h8-9H,3-7,10-19H2,1-2H3/b9-8- Key: QSZKEDWVAOAFQY-HJWRWDBZSA-N; InChI=1/C20H38O2/c1-3-4-5-6-7-8-9-10-11-12-13-14-15-16-17-18-19-22-20(2)21/h8-9H,3-7,10-19H2,1-2H3/b9-8- Key: QSZKEDWVAOAFQY-HJWRWDBZBI
- SMILES: CCCCCC/C=C\CCCCCCCCCCOC(=O)C

Properties
Chemical formula	C_{20}H_{38}O_{2}
Molar mass	310.51 g/mol

Related compounds
Related compounds	cis-vaccenic acid
- Except where otherwise noted, data are given for materials in their standard state (at 25 °C [77 °F], 100 kPa). verify (what is ?) Infobox references

11-cis-Vaccenyl acetate (cVA) is a volatile chemical compound that acts as a pheromone in Drosophila and at least one species of longhorn beetle. It is the acetate ester of vaccenyl alcohol.

The odorant receptor subunit Or67d was shown to be necessary for detection of cVA. Males that are mutant for Or67d start courting other males, whereas females that lack Or67d become less receptive towards males courting them. The sensory neurons expressing Or67d send projections to the glomerulus DA1. DA1 is one of the three glomeruli that is bigger in males than in females. Moreover, the projection neurons that connect to DA1 have sexually dimorphic arborizations in the higher brain centers (esp. lateral horn).
