= Paullinic acid =

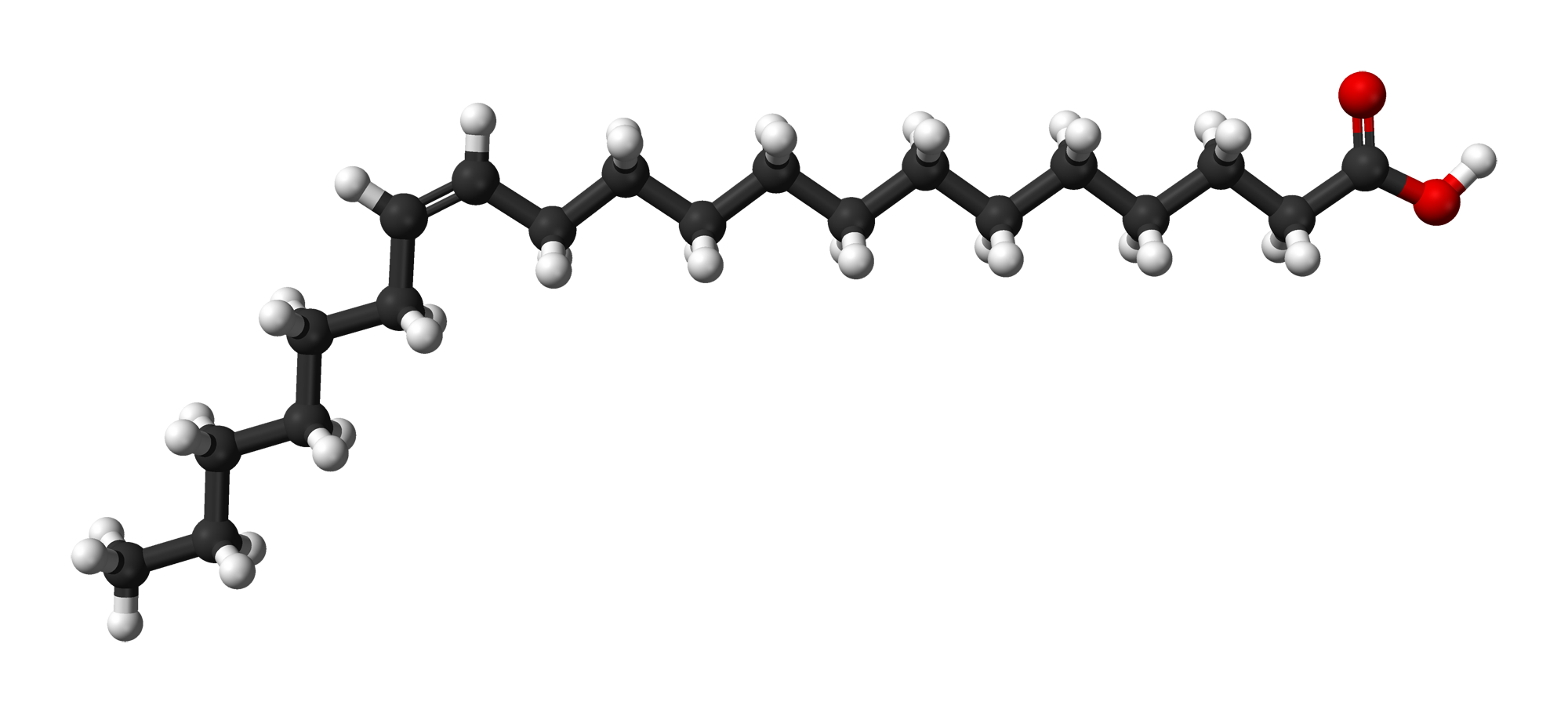

Names
- Preferred IUPAC name (13Z)-Icos-13-enoic acid
- Other names Eicos-13-enoic acid; cis-13-Eicosenoic acid; (Z)-Icos-13-enoic acid, 13c-20:1

Identifiers
CAS Number	17735-94-3
3D model (JSmol)	Interactive image
ChEBI	CHEBI:134479
ChemSpider	4471943
PubChem CID	5312518
UNII	CCL3CM45AT
CompTox Dashboard (EPA)	DTXSID80402624
- InChI: InChI=1S/C20H38O2/c1-2-3-4-5-6-7-8-9-10-11-12-13-14-15-16-17-18-19-20(21)22/h7-8H,2-6,9-19H2,1H3,(H,21,22)/b8-7- Key: URXZXNYJPAJJOQ-FPLPWBNLSA-N; InChI=1/C20H38O2/c1-2-3-4-5-6-7-8-9-10-11-12-13-14-15-16-17-18-19-20(21)22/h7-8H,2-6,9-19H2,1H3,(H,21,22)/b8-7- Key: URXZXNYJPAJJOQ-FPLPWBNLBI
- SMILES: O=C(O)CCCCCCCCCCC\C=C/CCCCCC

Properties
Chemical formula	C_{20}H_{38}O_{2}
Molar mass	310.522 g·mol^{−1}
- Except where otherwise noted, data are given for materials in their standard state (at 25 °C [77 °F], 100 kPa). Infobox references

Paullinic acid is an omega-7 fatty acid find in a variety of plant sources, including guarana (Paullinia cupana) from which it gets its name. It is one of a number of eicosenoic acids.

== See also ==
- 11-Eicosenoic acid
