= Macadamia oil =

Non-volatile oil expressed from the nut meat of the macadamia

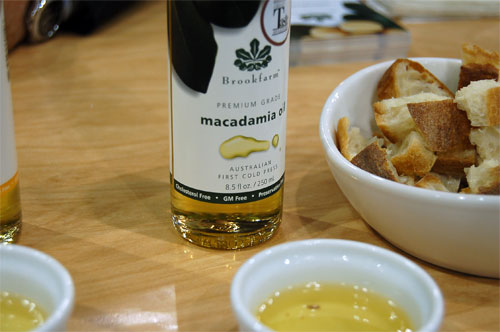
A bottle and dish of macadamia oil

Macadamia oil, also known as macadamia nut oil, is a non-volatile oil extracted from the nuts of the macadamia tree (Macadamia integrifolia), indigenous to Australia. This oil is used in culinary applications as a frying or salad oil, and in cosmetics for its emollient properties and as a fragrance fixative.

== Description ==
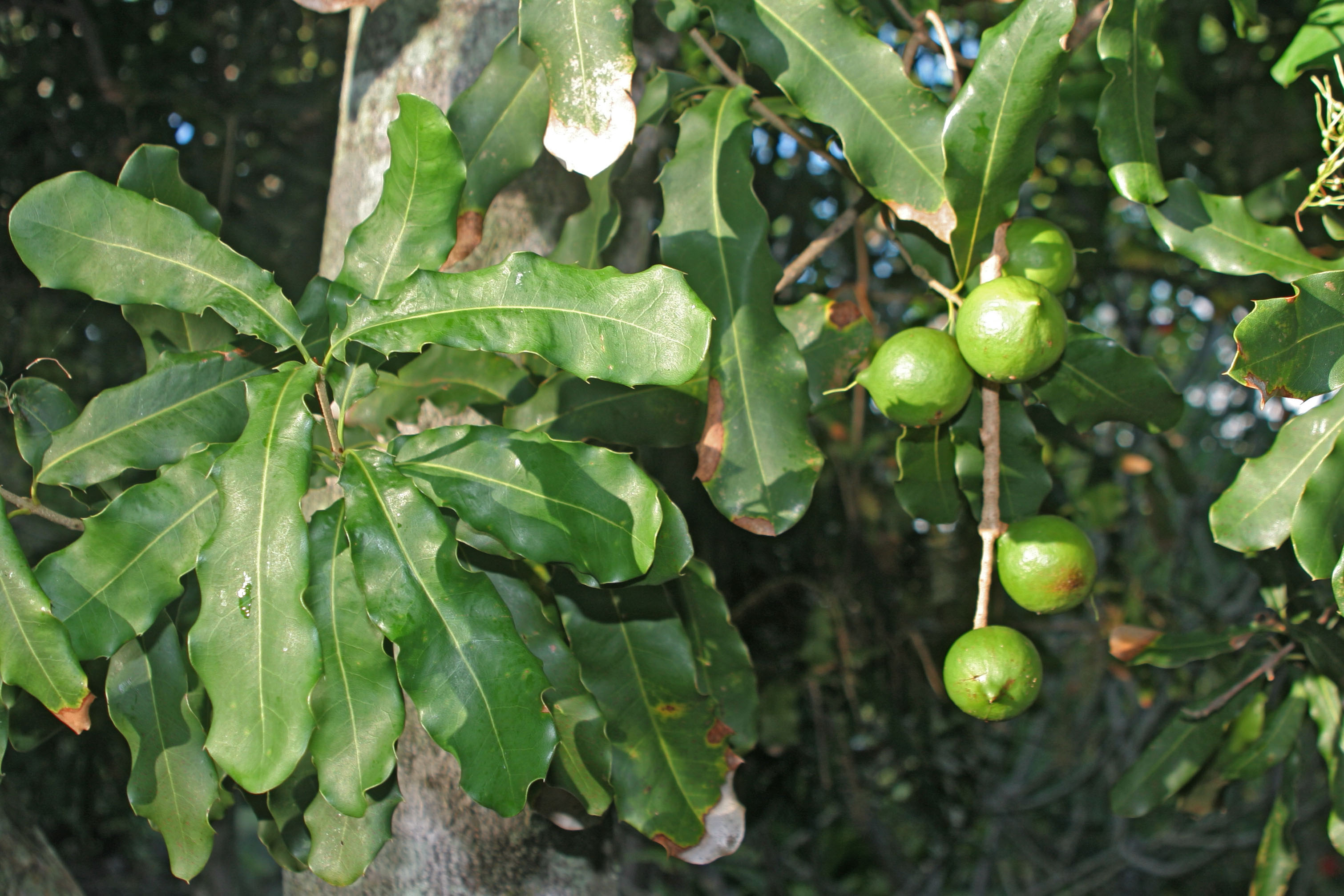
Macadamia integrifolia

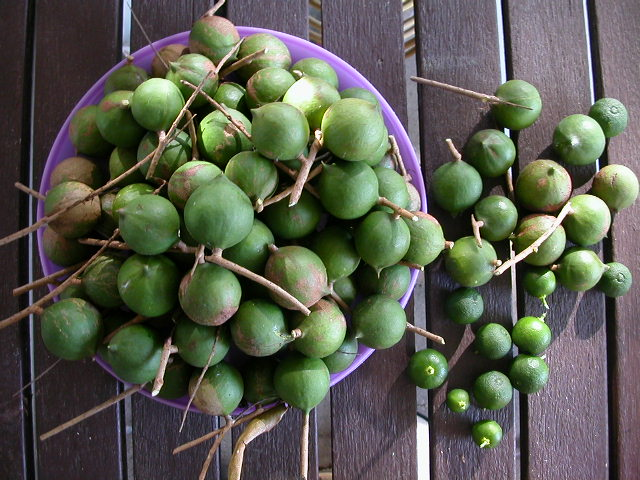
Fresh macadamia nuts

=== Fruits ===
Macadamia integrifolia is an Australian tree with holly-like leaves that grows well in a moist, organic soil and can withstand temperatures as low as −4.4 °C (24 °F). Seedlings bear in 5–7 years. The fruit is borne in a case enclosing an extremely hard spherical nut. The kernel is whitish, sweet and eaten raw or roasted. The flowers are white to cream and the leaves are in whorls of three. Propagation is by seed, grafting or air layering. It is grown commercially.

Common names of the trees are the Australian nut or the Queensland nut. Species that are “smooth shelled macadamia” are called Macadamia integrifolia and “rough shelled macadamia” are called Macadamia tetraphylla. Macadamia ternifolia is also the name used for M. integrifolia. Macadamia integrifolia is native to Australia where it grows in rain forests and close to streams. Macadamia tetraphylla is native to Southeastern Queensland and Northeastern New South Wales.

Macadamia oil technical data
Parameter	Units	Min	Max
FFA (oleic acid)	%		1.5
Peroxide value	meqO_{2}/Kg		5.0
Saponification value	mg/KOH/gr		
C:14:0 Myristic	%	0.7	1.6
C:16:0 Palmitic	%	9.3	13.1
C:16:1 Palmitoleic	%	24.0	36
C:18:0 Stearic	%	4.6	6.1
C:18:1 Oleic	%	40.0	51.0
C:18:2 Linoleic	%	1.6	3.7
C:20:0 Arachidic	%	2.9	4.0
C:20:1 Gadoleic	%	2.3	3.7
C:22:0 Behenic	%	0.6	1.7

=== Oil ===
The oil content ranges from 65% to 75% and sugar content ranges from 6% to 8%. These factors result in variable colors and texture when the nuts are roasted under the same conditions.

Macadamia oil is liquid at room temperature. The refined oil is clear, lightly amber-colored with a slightly nutty smell. It has a specific gravity of 900–920 and a flash point of over 300 °C (572 °F).

Oil accumulation does not occur until the nuts are fully grown and the shell hardens. It accumulates rapidly in the kernel during late summer when the reducing sugar content decreases. The composition of mature, roasted and salted macadamia nuts is shown. Fresh kernels contain up to 4.6% sugar. The oil consists of mainly unsaturated fatty acids and is similar in both species, although the proportion of unsaturated to saturated fatty acids appears to be slightly higher in M. integrifolia (6.2:1 compared with 4.8:1).

== Uses in food ==
Macadamia nut oil possesses properties conducive to high-heat cooking, such as a high smoke point and resistance to oxidative degradation. These qualities suggest its suitability for culinary techniques involving heat. A study examining the blend of refined bleached deodorized palm olein oil and Macadamia integrifolia oil for deep-fat frying found that the latter displayed enhanced stability and reduced oxidation, highlighting its potential for high-temperature cooking applications.

Macadamia nut oil is primarily used in unheated forms, such as dressings and drizzles. This is based on the premise that its unheated use better preserves the oil's delicate flavor and nutritional components. Therefore, while macadamia nut oil's heat tolerance supports its use in cooking, it is often preferred in raw applications to fully leverage its unique flavor profile.

== Fatty acids ==
Macadamia oil contains approximately 60% oleic acid, 19% palmitoleic acid, 1-3% linoleic acid and 1-2% α-linolenic acid. The oil is stable due to its low polyunsaturated fat content. The abundance of palmitoleic acid is unusual in plant-based oils.
