= 11-Eicosenoic acid =

20-Carbon monounsaturated fatty acid

Gondoic acid
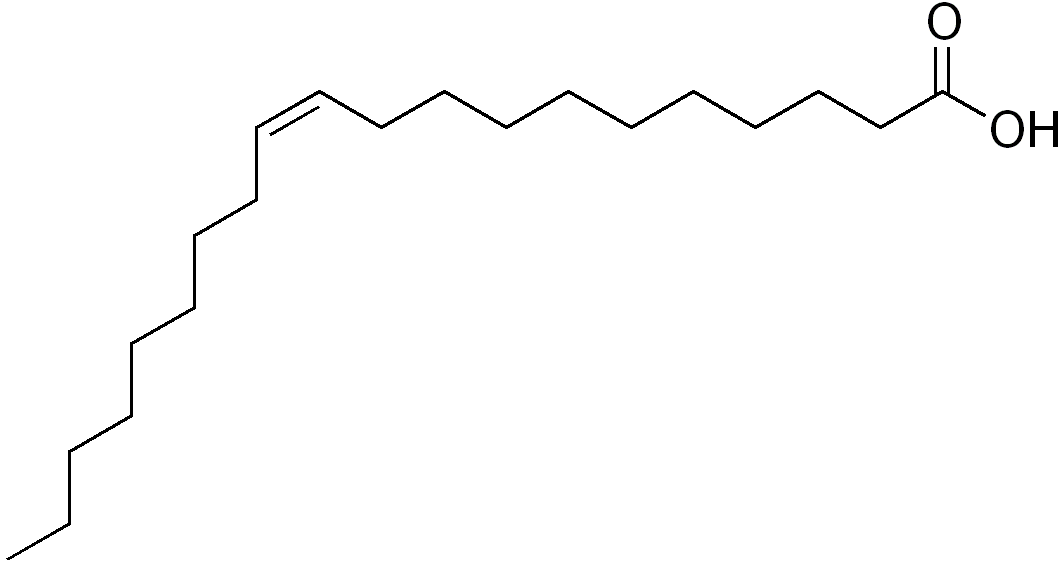

Names
- Preferred IUPAC name (11Z)-Icos-11-enoic acid
- Other names Gondoic acid cis-Gondoic acid cis-11-Eicosenoic acid 11-Eicosenoic acid 11Z-Eicosenoic acid cis-11-Icosenoic acid (11Z)-Icos-11-enoic acid

Identifiers
CAS Number	5561-99-9
3D model (JSmol)	Interactive image; Interactive image
ChEBI	CHEBI:32425
ChemSpider	4445895
KEGG	C16526
PubChem CID	5282768
UNII	UDX6WPL94T
CompTox Dashboard (EPA)	DTXSID30970949
- InChI: InChI=1S/C20H38O2/c1-2-3-4-5-6-7-8-9-10-11-12-13-14-15-16-17-18-19-20(21)22/h9-10H,2-8,11-19H2,1H3,(H,21,22)/b10-9- Key: BITHHVVYSMSWAG-KTKRTIGZSA-N; InChI=1/C20H38O2/c1-2-3-4-5-6-7-8-9-10-11-12-13-14-15-16-17-18-19-20(21)22/h9-10H,2-8,11-19H2,1H3,(H,21,22)/b10-9- Key: BITHHVVYSMSWAG-KTKRTIGZBC
- SMILES: CCCCCCCCC=CCCCCCCCCCC(=O)O; O=C(O)CCCCCCCCC\C=C/CCCCCCCC

Properties
Chemical formula	C_{20}H_{38}O_{2}
Molar mass	310.51 g/mol
Density	0.883 g/mL
Melting point	23 to 24 °C (73 to 75 °F; 296 to 297 K)

Hazards
Flash point	110 °C (230 °F; 383 K)
- Except where otherwise noted, data are given for materials in their standard state (at 25 °C [77 °F], 100 kPa). verify (what is ?) Infobox references

11-Eicosenoic acid, also called gondoic acid, is a monounsaturated omega-9 fatty acid found in a variety of plant oils and nuts; in particular jojoba oil. It is one of a number of eicosenoic acids.
