= Docosadienoic acid =

22-Carbon polyunsaturated fatty acid

Names
- IUPAC name (13Z, 16Z)-docosa-13,16-dienoic acid
- Other names DDA

Identifiers
CAS Number	26764-24-9
3D model (JSmol)	Interactive image
ChemSpider	4471979
KEGG	C16533
PubChem CID	53741802
UNII	4L3DC2UF5X
- InChI: InChI=1S/C22H40O2/c1-2-3-4-5-6-7-8-9-10-11-12-13-14-15-16-17-18-19-20-21-22(23)24/h18-21H,2-17H2,1H3,(H,23,24) Key: CVCXSNONTRFSEH-UHFFFAOYSA-N
- SMILES: CCCCCCCCCCCCCCCCCC=CC=CC(=O)O

Properties
Chemical formula	C_{22}H_{40}O_{2}
Molar mass	336.560 g·mol^{−1}
Density	0.9 g/cm³
Solubility in water	insoluble
- Except where otherwise noted, data are given for materials in their standard state (at 25 °C [77 °F], 100 kPa). Infobox references

Docosadienoic acid is a polyunsaturated very long-chain fatty acid (VLCFA) with a 22-carbon backbone and two double bonds.

== Isomers ==
The acid exists in several isomeric forms, depending on the positions and configurations of the double bonds. These isomers play important roles in biological systems and are used in chemical synthesis.

== Physical properties ==
Insoluble in water. Soluble in chloroform, hexane, ethanol.

== Natural occurrence ==
Docosadienoic acid can be detected in modest concentrations, generally not exceeding 3%, in the seed oils of many plants, particularly Cruciferae and Ranunculaceae.
