= Gadoleic acid =

20-Carbon monounsaturated fatty acid

Names
- Preferred IUPAC name (9Z)-Icos-9-enoic acid
- Other names cis-9-Eicosenoic acid

Identifiers
CAS Number	29204-02-2
3D model (JSmol)	Interactive image
ChEBI	CHEBI:32419
ChemSpider	4445894
ECHA InfoCard	100.291.826
PubChem CID	5282767
UNII	474JWU0SQ6
CompTox Dashboard (EPA)	DTXSID101045292
- InChI: InChI=1S/C20H38O2/c1-2-3-4-5-6-7-8-9-10-11-12-13-14-15-16-17-18-19-20(21)22/h11-12H,2-10,13-19H2,1H3,(H,21,22)/b12-11- Key: LQJBNNIYVWPHFW-QXMHVHEDSA-N; InChI=1/C20H38O2/c1-2-3-4-5-6-7-8-9-10-11-12-13-14-15-16-17-18-19-20(21)22/h11-12H,2-10,13-19H2,1H3,(H,21,22)/b12-11- Key: LQJBNNIYVWPHFW-QXMHVHEDBG
- SMILES: O=C(O)CCCCCCC\C=C/CCCCCCCCCC

Properties
Chemical formula	C_{20}H_{38}O_{2}
Molar mass	310.522 g·mol^{−1}
Melting point	23 to 24 °C (73 to 75 °F; 296 to 297 K)
- Except where otherwise noted, data are given for materials in their standard state (at 25 °C [77 °F], 100 kPa). Infobox references

Gadoleic acid (20:1 n−11) is an unsaturated fatty acid. It is a prominent component of some fish oils including cod liver oil. It is one of a number of eicosenoic acids. Its name is derived from a combination of the genus for cod (Gadus) and the Latin word oleum (oil), which itself is derived from the Ancient Greek ἔλαιον (elaion) meaning olive oil.
