= Monounsaturated fat =

Fatty acid

In biochemistry and nutrition, a monounsaturated fat is a fat which contains a monounsaturated fatty acid (MUFA), a subclass of fatty acid characterized by having a double bond in the fatty acid chain with all of the remaining carbon atoms being single-bonded. By contrast, polyunsaturated fatty acids (PUFAs) have more than one double bond.

== Molecular description ==
The main constituent of cocoa butter is the monounsaturated fat derived from palmitic acid, oleic acid, and stearic acid.

Monounsaturated fats are generally available as triglycerides containing one unsaturated fatty acid. Almost invariably that fatty acid is oleic acid (18:1 n−9). Palmitoleic acid (16:1 n−7) and cis-vaccenic acid (18:1 n−7) occur in small amounts in fats.

Fatty acid component (mole %) of selected fats
fat source	saturated	monounsaturated	doubly unsaturated	tri unsaturated
Palm kernel	60–65	10–18	1–3	trace
Cottonseed oil	23–30	14–21	45–58	trace
Corn oil	10–15	25–35	40–60	trace
Linseed oil	8–11	18–26	14–20	51–56
Soybean oil	11–17	18–25	49–57	6–11
Peanut oil	12–17	35–42	39–44	trace
Lard	36–48	36–52	10–12	1
Beef tallow	43–64	26–45	2–6	1
Chicken	45–67	12–45	3–10	trace

== Health ==
Studies have shown that substituting dietary monounsaturated fat for saturated fat is associated with increased daily physical activity and resting energy expenditure. More physical activity was associated with a higher-oleic acid diet than one of a palmitic acid diet. From the study, it is shown that more monounsaturated fats lead to less anger and irritability.

Foods containing monounsaturated fats may affect low-density lipoprotein (LDL) cholesterol and high-density lipoprotein (HDL) cholesterol.

Levels of oleic acid along with other monounsaturated fatty acids in red blood cell membranes were positively associated with breast cancer risk. The saturation index (SI) of the same membranes was inversely associated with breast cancer risk. Monounsaturated fats and low SI in erythrocyte membranes are predictors of postmenopausal breast cancer. Both of these variables depend on the activity of the enzyme delta-9 desaturase (Δ9-d).

In children, consumption of monounsaturated oils is associated with healthier serum lipid profiles.

The Mediterranean diet is one heavily influenced by monounsaturated fats. In the late 20th century, people in Mediterranean countries consumed more total fat than Northern European countries, but most of the fat was in the form of monounsaturated fatty acids from olive oil and omega-3 fatty acids from fish, vegetables, and certain meats like lamb, while consumption of saturated fat was minimal in comparison. A 2017 review found evidence that the practice of a Mediterranean diet could lead to a decreased risk of cardiovascular diseases, overall cancer incidence, neurodegenerative diseases, diabetes, and early death. A 2018 review showed that the practice of the Mediterranean diet may improve overall health status, such as the reduced risk of non-communicable diseases. It also may reduce the social and economic costs of diet-related illnesses.

=== Diabetes ===
Increasing monounsaturated fat and decreasing saturated fat intake could improve insulin sensitivity, but only when the overall fat intake of the diet was low. However, some monounsaturated fatty acids (in the same way as saturated fats) may promote insulin resistance, whereas polyunsaturated fatty acids may be protective against insulin resistance.

== Sources ==
Monounsaturated fats are found in animal flesh such as red meat, whole milk products, nuts, and high fat fruits such as olives and avocados. Algal oil is about 92% monounsaturated fat. Olive oil is about 75% monounsaturated fat. The high oleic variety sunflower oil contains at least 70% monounsaturated fat. Canola oil and cashews are both about 58% monounsaturated fat. Tallow (beef fat) is about 50% monounsaturated fat. and lard is about 40% monounsaturated fat. Other sources include hazelnut, avocado oil, macadamia nut oil, grapeseed oil, groundnut oil (peanut oil), sesame oil, corn oil, popcorn, whole grain wheat, cereal, oatmeal, almond oil, sunflower oil, hemp oil, and tea-oil Camellia.

Fat composition in different foods

Fat composition as weight percentage of total fat
Food	Saturated (%)	Mono- unsaturated (%)	Poly- unsaturated (%)
Cooking oils
Algal oil	4	92	4
Canola	8	64	28
Coconut oil	87	13	0
Corn oil	13	24	59
Cottonseed oil	27	19	54
Olive oil	14	73	11
Palm kernel oil	86	12	2
Palm oil	51	39	10
Peanut oil	17	46	32
Rice bran oil	25	38	37
Safflower oil, high oleic	6	75	14
Safflower oil, linoleic	6	14	75
Soybean oil	15	24	58
Sunflower oil	11	20	69
Mustard oil	11	59	21
Dairy products
Butterfat	66	30	4
Cheese, regular	64	29	3
Cheese, light	60	30	0
Ice cream, gourmet	62	29	4
Ice cream, light	62	29	4
Milk, whole	62	28	4
Milk, 2%	62	30	0
Whipping cream*	66	26	5
Meats
Beef	33	38	5
Ground sirloin	38	44	4
Pork chop	35	44	8
Ham	35	49	16
Chicken breast	29	34	21
Chicken	34	23	30
Turkey breast	30	20	30
Turkey drumstick	32	22	30
Fish, orange roughy	23	15	46
Salmon	28	33	28
Hot dog, beef	42	48	5
Hot dog, turkey	28	40	22
Burger, fast food	36	44	6
Cheeseburger, fast food	43	40	7
Breaded chicken sandwich	20	39	32
Grilled chicken sandwich	26	42	20
Sausage, Polish	37	46	11
Sausage, turkey	28	40	22
Pizza, sausage	41	32	20
Pizza, cheese	60	28	5
Nuts
Almonds dry roasted	9	65	21
Cashews dry roasted	20	59	17
Macadamia dry roasted	15	79	2
Peanut dry roasted	14	50	31
Pecans dry roasted	8	62	25
Flaxseeds, ground	8	23	65
Sesame seeds	14	38	44
Soybeans	14	22	57
Sunflower seeds	11	19	66
Walnuts dry roasted	9	23	63
Sweets and baked goods
Candy, chocolate bar	59	33	3
Candy, fruit chews	14	44	38
Cookie, oatmeal raisin	22	47	27
Cookie, chocolate chip	35	42	18
Cake, yellow	60	25	10
Pastry, Danish	50	31	14
Fats added during cooking or at the table
Butter, stick	63	29	3
Butter, whipped	62	29	4
Margarine, stick	18	39	39
Margarine, tub	16	33	49
Margarine, light tub	19	46	33
Lard	39	45	11
Shortening	25	45	26
Chicken fat	30	45	21
Beef fat	41	43	3
Goose fat	33	55	11
Dressing, blue cheese	16	54	25
Dressing, light Italian	14	24	58
Other
Egg yolk fat	36	44	16
Avocado	16	71	13
Unless else specified in boxes, then reference is:
* 3% is trans fats

== See also ==
- High density lipoprotein
- Fatty acid synthesis
