= Vaccenic acid =

18-Carbon monounsaturated fatty acid

- Skeletal formula

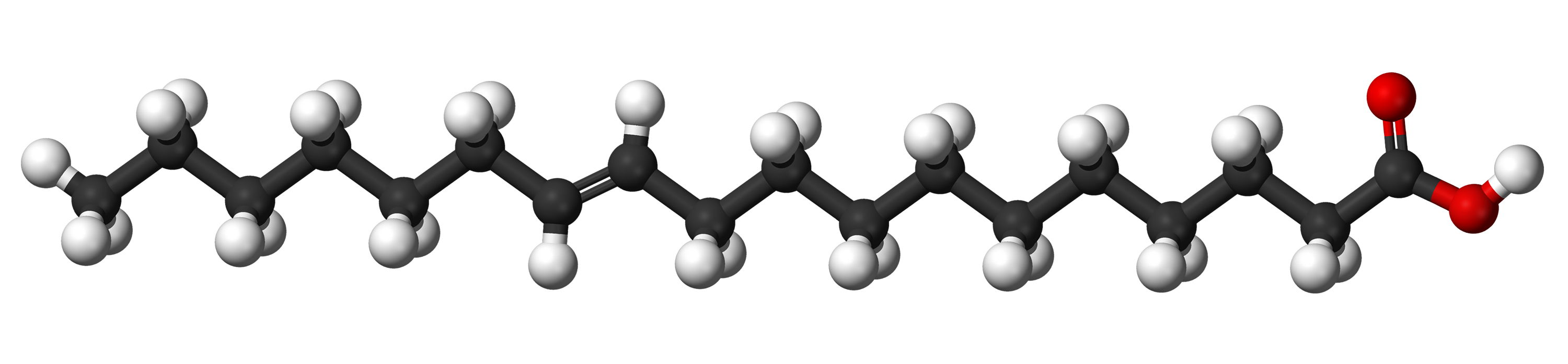
- Ball-and-stick model

Names
- Preferred IUPAC name (11E)-Octadec-11-enoic acid

Identifiers
CAS Number	693-72-1
3D model (JSmol)	Interactive image
ChEBI	CHEBI:28727
ChemSpider	4444571
ECHA InfoCard	100.010.691
PubChem CID	5281127
UNII	GQ72OGU4EV
CompTox Dashboard (EPA)	DTXSID301009341
- InChI: InChI=1S/C18H34O2/c1-2-3-4-5-6-7-8-9-10-11-12-13-14-15-16-17-18(19)20/h7-8H,2-6,9-17H2,1H3,(H,19,20)/b8-7+ Key: UWHZIFQPPBDJPM-BQYQJAHWSA-N; InChI=1/C18H34O2/c1-2-3-4-5-6-7-8-9-10-11-12-13-14-15-16-17-18(19)20/h7-8H,2-6,9-17H2,1H3,(H,19,20)/b8-7+ Key: UWHZIFQPPBDJPM-BQYQJAHWBK
- SMILES: CCCCCC/C=C/CCCCCCCCCC(O)=O

Properties
Chemical formula	C_{18}H_{34}O_{2}
Molar mass	282.461 g/mol
Melting point	44 °C (111 °F)
Boiling point	172 °C (342 °F)
- Except where otherwise noted, data are given for materials in their standard state (at 25 °C [77 °F], 100 kPa). verify (what is ?) Infobox references

Vaccenic acid is a naturally occurring trans fatty acid and an omega-7 fatty acid. It is the predominant kind of trans-fatty acid found in human milk, in the fat of ruminants, and in dairy products such as milk, butter, and yogurt. Vaccenic acid was discovered in 1928 in animal fats and butter.

Mammals (including humans) convert it into rumenic acid, a conjugated linoleic acid. This reaction is mediated by delta-9 desaturase.

Cow milk had highest vaccenic acid content in the first few days of milking.

Its IUPAC name is (11E)-11-octadecenoic acid, and its lipid shorthand name is 18:1 trans-11. The name was derived from the Latin vacca (cow). Its stereoisomer, cis-vaccenic acid, is found in sea buckthorn (Hippophae rhamnoides) oil. It is also found in significant amounts in avocado oil. Its IUPAC name is (11Z)-11-octadecenoic acid, and its lipid shorthand name is 18:1 cis-11.
