= Palmitoleic acid =

16-Carbon monounsaturated fatty acid

Names
- Preferred IUPAC name (9Z)-Hexadec-9-enoic acid
- Other names Palmitoleic acid cis-Palmitoleic acid 9-cis-Hexadecenoic acid C16:1 (Lipid numbers)

Identifiers
| CAS Number | 373-49-9 |
| 3D model (JSmol) | Interactive image |
| ChEBI | CHEBI:28716 |
| ChemSpider | 393216 |
| ECHA InfoCard | 100.006.151 |
| IUPHAR/BPS | 5547 |
| PubChem CID | 445638 |
| UNII | 209B6YPZ4I |
| CompTox Dashboard (EPA) | DTXSID0041197 |
- InChI: InChI=1S/C16H30O2/c1-2-3-4-5-6-7-8-9-10-11-12-13-14-15-16(17)18/h7-8H,2-6,9-15H2,1H3,(H,17,18)/b8-7- Key: SECPZKHBENQXJG-FPLPWBNLSA-N; InChI=1/C16H30O2/c1-2-3-4-5-6-7-8-9-10-11-12-13-14-15-16(17)18/h7-8H,2-6,9-15H2,1H3,(H,17,18)/b8-7- Key: SECPZKHBENQXJG-FPLPWBNLBE
- SMILES: O=C(O)CCCCCCC\C=C/CCCCCC

Properties
| Chemical formula | C_{16}H_{30}O_{2} |
| Molar mass | 254.414 g·mol^{−1} |
| Density | 0.894 g/cm^{3} |
| Melting point | −0.1 °C (31.8 °F; 273.0 K) |
- Except where otherwise noted, data are given for materials in their standard state (at 25 °C [77 °F], 100 kPa). verify (what is ?) Infobox references

Palmitoleic acid, or (9Z)-hexadec-9-enoic acid, is an omega-7 monounsaturated fatty acid (16:1n-7) with the formula CH_{3}(CH_{2})_{5}CH=CH(CH_{2})_{7}COOH. It is a rare component of fats. It is present in all tissues but, in general, is found in higher concentrations in the liver.

It is biosynthesized from palmitic acid by the action of the enzyme Stearoyl-CoA desaturase-1. Palmitoleic acid exists in two isomers, cis and trans.

== Natural sources ==
Palmitoleic acid is found in trace amounts in most foods except for sardine oil, which contains 15% of this acid as a component of triglycerides.

Other dietary sources of palmitoleic acid include breast milk, a variety of animal fats, vegetable oils, and marine oils. Avocado oil, Macadamia oil (Macadamia integrifolia), and sea buckthorn oil (Hippophae rhamnoides) are botanical sources with high concentrations, containing 7-12%, 17% and 19-29% palmitoleic acid, respectively..

Mink oil is also a source of palmitoleic acid.
