= Fatty acid =

Carboxylic acid

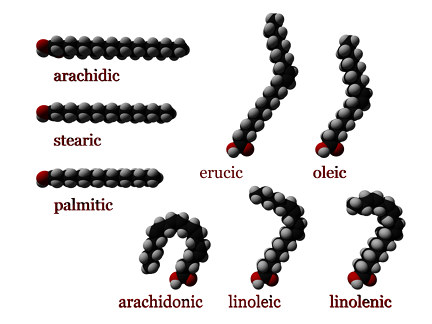
Three-dimensional representations of several fatty acids. Saturated fatty acids have perfectly straight chain structure. Unsaturated ones are typically bent, unless they have a trans configuration.

In chemistry, particularly in biochemistry, a fatty acid is a carboxylic acid with an aliphatic chain, which is either saturated or unsaturated. Most naturally occurring fatty acids have an unbranched chain of an even number of carbon atoms, from 4 to 28. Fatty acids are a major component of the lipids (up to 70% by weight) in some species such as microalgae but in some other organisms are not found in their standalone form, but instead exist as three main classes of esters: triglycerides, phospholipids, and cholesteryl esters. In any of these forms, fatty acids are both important dietary sources of fuel for animals and important structural components for cells.

== History ==
The concept of fatty acid (acide gras) was introduced in 1813 by Michel Eugène Chevreul, though he initially used some variant terms: graisse acide and acide huileux ("acid fat" and "oily acid").

== Types of fatty acids ==
Comparison of the trans isomer elaidic acid (top) and the cis isomer oleic acid (bottom)

Fatty acids are classified in many ways: by length, by saturation vs unsaturation, by even vs odd carbon content, and by linear vs branched.

=== Length of fatty acids ===
- Short-chain fatty acids (SCFAs) are fatty acids with aliphatic tails of five or fewer carbons (e.g. butyric acid).
- Medium-chain fatty acids (MCFAs) are fatty acids with aliphatic tails of 6 to 12 carbons, which can form medium-chain triglycerides.
- Long-chain fatty acids (LCFAs) are fatty acids with aliphatic tails of 13 to 21 carbons.
- Very long chain fatty acids (VLCFAs) are fatty acids with aliphatic tails of 22 or more carbons.

=== Saturated fatty acids ===
Saturated fatty acids have no C=C double bonds. They have the formula CH_{3}(CH_{2})_{n}COOH, where n is some positive integer. An important saturated fatty acid is stearic acid (n = 16), which when neutralized with sodium hydroxide is the most common form of soap.

Arachidic acid, a saturated fatty acid

Examples of saturated fatty acids
Common name	Chemical structure	C :D (Note: "C:D" is the numerical symbol: total amount of (C)arbon atoms of the fatty acid, and the number of (D)ouble (unsaturated) bonds in it; if D > 1 it is assumed that the double bonds are separated by one or more methylene bridge(s).)
Propionic acid	CH_{3}CH_{2}COOH	3:0
Butyric acid	CH_{3}(CH_{2})_{2}COOH	4:0
Caprylic acid	CH_{3}(CH_{2})_{6}COOH	8:0
Capric acid	CH_{3}(CH_{2})_{8}COOH	10:0
Lauric acid	CH_{3}(CH_{2})_{10}COOH	12:0
Myristic acid	CH_{3}(CH_{2})_{12}COOH	14:0
Palmitic acid	CH_{3}(CH_{2})_{14}COOH	16:0
Stearic acid	CH_{3}(CH_{2})_{16}COOH	18:0
Arachidic acid	CH_{3}(CH_{2})_{18}COOH	20:0
Behenic acid	CH_{3}(CH_{2})_{20}COOH	22:0
Lignoceric acid	CH_{3}(CH_{2})_{22}COOH	24:0
Cerotic acid	CH_{3}(CH_{2})_{24}COOH	26:0

=== Unsaturated fatty acids ===
Unsaturated fatty acids have one or more C=C double bonds. The C=C double bonds can give either cis or trans isomers.

cis
A cis configuration means that the two hydrogen atoms adjacent to the double bond stick out on the same side of the chain. The rigidity of the double bond freezes its conformation and, in the case of the cis isomer, causes the chain to bend and restricts the conformational freedom of the fatty acid. The more double bonds the chain has in the cis configuration, the less flexibility it has. When a chain has many cis bonds, it becomes quite curved in its most accessible conformations. For example, oleic acid, with one double bond, has a "kink" in it, whereas linoleic acid, with two double bonds, has a more pronounced bend. α-Linolenic acid, with three double bonds, favors a hooked shape. The effect of this is that, in restricted environments, such as when fatty acids are part of a phospholipid in a lipid bilayer or triglycerides in lipid droplets, cis bonds limit the ability of fatty acids to be closely packed, and therefore can affect the melting temperature of the membrane or of the fat. Cis unsaturated fatty acids, however, increase cellular membrane fluidity, whereas trans unsaturated fatty acids do not.
trans
A trans configuration, by contrast, means that the adjacent two hydrogen atoms lie on opposite sides of the chain. As a result, they do not cause the chain to bend much, and their shape is similar to straight saturated fatty acids.

In most naturally occurring unsaturated fatty acids, each double bond has three (n−3), six (n−6), or nine (n−9) carbon atoms after it, and all double bonds have a cis configuration. Most fatty acids in the trans configuration (trans fats) are not found in nature and are the result of human processing (e.g., hydrogenation). Some trans fatty acids also occur naturally in the milk and meat of ruminants (such as cattle and sheep). They are produced, by fermentation, in the rumen of these animals. They are also found in dairy products from milk of ruminants, and may be also found in breast milk of women who obtained them from their diet.

The geometric differences between the various types of unsaturated fatty acids, as well as between saturated and unsaturated fatty acids, play an important role in biological processes, and in the construction of biological structures (such as cell membranes).

Examples of unsaturated fatty acids
Common name	Chemical structure	Δ^{x} (Note: Each double bond in the fatty acid is indicated by Δx, where the double bond is located on the xth carbon–carbon bond, counting from the carboxylic acid end.)	C:D	IUPAC	n−x (Note: In n minus x (also ω−x or omega-x) nomenclature a double bond of the fatty acid is located on the xth carbon–carbon bond, counting from the terminal methyl carbon (designated as n or ω) toward the carbonyl carbon.)
Omega−3:
Eicosapentaenoic acid	CH_{3}CH_{2}CH=CHCH_{2}CH=CHCH_{2}CH=CHCH_{2}CH=CHCH_{2}CH=CH(CH_{2})_{3}COOH	cis,cis,cis,cis,cis-Δ^{5},Δ^{8},Δ^{11},Δ^{14},Δ^{17}	20:5	20:5(5,8,11,14,17)	n−3
α-Linolenic acid	CH_{3}CH_{2}CH=CHCH_{2}CH=CHCH_{2}CH=CH(CH_{2})_{7}COOH	cis,cis,cis-Δ^{9},Δ^{12},Δ^{15}	18:3	18:3(9,12,15)	n−3
Docosahexaenoic acid	CH_{3}CH_{2}CH=CHCH_{2}CH=CHCH_{2}CH=CHCH_{2}CH=CHCH_{2}CH=CHCH_{2}CH=CH(CH_{2})_{2}COOH	cis,cis,cis,cis,cis,cis-Δ^{4},Δ^{7},Δ^{10},Δ^{13},Δ^{16},Δ^{19}	22:6	22:6(4,7,10,13,16,19)	n−3
Omega−6:
Arachidonic acid	CH_{3}(CH_{2})_{4}CH=CHCH_{2}CH=CHCH_{2}CH=CHCH_{2}CH=CH(CH_{2})_{3}COOH^{NIST}	cis,cis,cis,cis-Δ^{5}Δ^{8},Δ^{11},Δ^{14}	20:4	20:4(5,8,11,14)	n−6
Linoleic acid	CH_{3}(CH_{2})_{4}CH=CHCH_{2}CH=CH(CH_{2})_{7}COOH	cis,cis-Δ^{9},Δ^{12}	18:2	18:2(9,12)	n−6
Linolelaidic acid	CH_{3}(CH_{2})_{4}CH=CHCH_{2}CH=CH(CH_{2})_{7}COOH	trans,trans-Δ^{9},Δ^{12}	18:2	18:2(9t,12t)	n−6
Omega−9:
Oleic acid	CH_{3}(CH_{2})_{7}CH=CH(CH_{2})_{7}COOH	cis-Δ^{9}	18:1	18:1(9)	n−9
Elaidic acid	CH_{3}(CH_{2})_{7}CH=CH(CH_{2})_{7}COOH	trans-Δ^{9}	18:1	18:1(9t)	n−9
Erucic acid	CH_{3}(CH_{2})_{7}CH=CH(CH_{2})_{11}COOH	cis-Δ^{13}	22:1	22:1(13)	n−9
Omega−5, 7, and 10:
Myristoleic acid	CH_{3}(CH_{2})_{3}CH=CH(CH_{2})_{7}COOH	cis-Δ^{9}	14:1	14:1(9)	n−5
Palmitoleic acid	CH_{3}(CH_{2})_{5}CH=CH(CH_{2})_{7}COOH	cis-Δ^{9}	16:1	16:1(9)	n−7
Vaccenic acid	CH_{3}(CH_{2})_{5}CH=CH(CH_{2})_{9}COOH	trans-Δ^{11}	18:1	18:1(11t)	n−7
Sapienic acid	CH_{3}(CH_{2})_{8}CH=CH(CH_{2})_{4}COOH	cis-Δ^{6}	16:1	16:1(6)	n−10

=== Even- vs odd-chained fatty acids ===
Most naturally occurring fatty acids are even-chained, e.g. stearic (C18:0) and oleic (C18:1), meaning they are composed of an even number of carbon atoms; odd-chained fatty acids (OCFA) also occur, albeit far less frequently. The most common OCFA are the saturated C15 and C17 derivatives, pentadecanoic acid and heptadecanoic acid respectively, which are found in dairy products. On a molecular level, OCFAs are biosynthesized and metabolized slightly differently from the even-chained relatives.

=== Branching ===
Most common fatty acids are straight-chain compounds, with no additional carbon atoms bonded as side groups to the main hydrocarbon chain. Branched-chain fatty acids contain one or more methyl groups bonded to the hydrocarbon chain.

== Nomenclature ==
=== Carbon atom numbering ===
Numbering of carbon atoms. The systematic (IUPAC) C-x numbers are in blue. The omega-minus "ω−x" labels are in red. The Greek letter labels are in green. (Note: A common mistake is to say that the last carbon is "ω−1". Another common mistake is to say that the position of a bond in omega-notation is the number of the carbon closest to the END. For double bonds, these two mistakes happen to compensate each other; so that a "ω−3" fatty acid indeed has the double bond between the 3rd and 4th carbons from the end, counting the methyl as 1. However, for substitutions and other purposes, they don't: a hydroxyl "at ω−3" is on carbon 15 (4th from the end), not 16. See for example this article. doi:10.1016/0005-2760(75)90089-2 Note also that the "−" in the omega-notation is a minus sign, and "ω−3" should in principle be read "omega minus three". However, it is very common (especially in non-scientific literature) to write it "ω-3" (with a hyphen/dash) and read it as "omega-three". See for example Karen Dooley (2008), Omega-three fatty acids and diabetes.) Note that unsaturated fatty acids with a cis configuration are actually "kinked" rather than straight as shown here.

Most naturally occurring fatty acids have an unbranched chain of carbon atoms, with a carboxyl group (–COOH) at one end, and a methyl group (–CH3) at the other end.

The position of each carbon atom in the backbone of a fatty acid is usually indicated by counting from 1 at the −COOH end. Carbon number x is often abbreviated C-x (or sometimes Cx), with x = 1, 2, 3, etc. This is the numbering scheme recommended by the IUPAC.

Another convention uses letters of the Greek alphabet in sequence, starting with the first carbon after the carboxyl group. Thus carbon α (alpha) is C-2, carbon β (beta) is C-3, and so forth.

Although fatty acids can be of diverse lengths, in this second convention the last carbon in the chain is always labelled as ω (omega), which is the last letter in the Greek alphabet. A third numbering convention counts the carbons from that end, using the labels "ω", "ω−1", "ω−2". Alternatively, the label "ω−x" is written "n−x", where the "n" is meant to represent the number of carbons in the chain.

In either numbering scheme, the position of a double bond in a fatty acid chain is always specified by giving the label of the carbon closest to the carboxyl end. Thus, in an 18 carbon fatty acid, a double bond between C-12 (or ω−6) and C-13 (or ω−5) is said to be "at" position C-12 or ω−6. The IUPAC naming of the acid, such as "octadec-12-enoic acid" (or the more pronounceable variant "12-octadecenoic acid") is always based on the "C" numbering.

The notation Δ^{x,y,...} is traditionally used to specify a fatty acid with double bonds at positions x,y,.... (The capital Greek letter "Δ" (delta) corresponds to Roman "D", for Double bond). Thus, for example, the 20-carbon arachidonic acid is Δ^{5,8,11,14}, meaning that it has double bonds between carbons 5 and 6, 8 and 9, 11 and 12, and 14 and 15.

In the context of human diet and fat metabolism, unsaturated fatty acids are often classified by the position of the double bond closest between to the ω carbon (only), even in the case of multiple double bonds such as the essential fatty acids. Thus linoleic acid (18 carbons, Δ^{9,12}), γ-linolenic acid (18-carbon, Δ^{6,9,12}), and arachidonic acid (20-carbon, Δ^{5,8,11,14}) are all classified as "ω−6" fatty acids; meaning that their formula ends with –CH=CH–CH_{2}–CH_{2}–CH_{2}–CH_{2}–CH_{3}.

Fatty acids with an odd number of carbon atoms are called odd-chain fatty acids, whereas the rest are even-chain fatty acids. The difference is relevant to gluconeogenesis.

=== Naming of fatty acids ===
The following table describes the most common systems of naming fatty acids.

Nomenclature	Examples	Explanation
Trivial	Palmitoleic acid	Trivial names (or common names) are non-systematic historical names, which are the most frequent naming system used in literature. Most common fatty acids have trivial names in addition to their systematic names (see below). These names frequently do not follow any pattern, but they are concise and often unambiguous.
Systematic	cis-9-octadec-9-enoic acid (9Z)-octadec-9-enoic acid	Systematic names (or IUPAC names) derive from the standard IUPAC Rules for the Nomenclature of Organic Chemistry, published in 1979, along with a recommendation published specifically for lipids in 1977. Carbon atom numbering begins from the carboxylic end of the molecule backbone. Double bonds are labelled with cis-/trans- notation or E-/Z- notation, where appropriate. This notation is generally more verbose than common nomenclature, but has the advantage of being more technically clear and descriptive.
Δ^{x}	cis-Δ^{9}, cis-Δ^{12} octadecadienoic acid	In Δ^{x} (or delta-x) nomenclature, each double bond is indicated by Δ^{x}, where the double bond begins at the xth carbon–carbon bond, counting from carboxylic end of the molecule backbone. Each double bond is preceded by a cis- or trans- prefix, indicating the configuration of the molecule around the bond. For example, linoleic acid is designated "cis-Δ^{9}, cis-Δ^{12} octadecadienoic acid". This nomenclature has the advantage of being less verbose than systematic nomenclature, but is no more technically clear or descriptive.
n−x (or ω−x)	n−3 (or ω−3)	n−x (n minus x; also ω−x or omega−x) nomenclature both provides names for individual compounds and classifies them by their likely biosynthetic properties in animals. A double bond is located on the x^{th} carbon–carbon bond, counting from the methyl end of the molecule backbone. For example, α-linolenic acid is classified as a n−3 or omega−3 fatty acid, and so it is likely to share a biosynthetic pathway with other compounds of this type. The ω−x, omega−x, or "omega" notation is common in popular nutritional literature, but IUPAC has deprecated it in favor of n−x notation in technical documents. The most commonly researched fatty acid biosynthetic pathways are n−3 and n−6.
Lipid numbers	18:3; 18:3n3 18:3, cis,cis,cis-Δ^{9},Δ^{12},Δ^{15} 18:3(9,12,15)	Lipid numbers take the form C:D, where C is the number of carbon atoms in the fatty acid and D is the number of double bonds in the fatty acid. If D is more than one, the double bonds are assumed to be interrupted by CH_{2} units, i.e., at intervals of 3 carbon atoms along the chain. For instance, α-linolenic acid is an 18:3 fatty acid and its three double bonds are located at positions Δ^{9}, Δ^{12}, and Δ^{15}. This notation can be ambiguous, as some different fatty acids can have the same C:D numbers. Consequently, when ambiguity exists this notation is usually paired with either a Δ^{x} or n−x term. For instance, although α-linolenic acid and γ-linolenic acid are both 18:3, they may be unambiguously described as 18:3n3 and 18:3n6 fatty acids, respectively. For the same purpose, IUPAC recommends using a list of double bond positions in parentheses, appended to the C:D notation. For instance, IUPAC recommended notations for α- and γ-linolenic acid are 18:3(9,12,15) and 18:3(6,9,12), respectively.

=== Free fatty acids ===
When circulating in the plasma (plasma fatty acids), not in their ester, fatty acids are known as non-esterified fatty acids (NEFAs) or free fatty acids (FFAs). FFAs are always bound to a transport protein, such as albumin.

FFAs also form from triglyceride food oils and fats by hydrolysis, contributing to the characteristic rancid odor. An analogous process happens in biodiesel with risk of part corrosion.

== Production ==
=== Industrial ===
Fatty acids are usually produced industrially by the hydrolysis of triglycerides, with the removal of glycerol (see oleochemicals). Phospholipids represent another source. Some fatty acids are produced synthetically by hydrocarboxylation of alkenes.

=== By animals ===
In animals, fatty acids are formed from carbohydrates predominantly in the liver, adipose tissue, and the mammary glands during lactation.

Carbohydrates are converted into pyruvate by glycolysis as the first important step in the conversion of carbohydrates into fatty acids. Pyruvate is then decarboxylated to form acetyl-CoA in the mitochondrion. However, this acetyl CoA needs to be transported into cytosol where the synthesis of fatty acids occurs. This cannot occur directly. To obtain cytosolic acetyl-CoA, citrate (produced by the condensation of acetyl-CoA with oxaloacetate) is removed from the citric acid cycle and carried across the inner mitochondrial membrane into the cytosol. There it is cleaved by ATP citrate lyase into acetyl-CoA and oxaloacetate. The oxaloacetate is returned to the mitochondrion as malate. The cytosolic acetyl-CoA is carboxylated by acetyl-CoA carboxylase into malonyl-CoA, the first committed step in the synthesis of fatty acids.

Malonyl-CoA is then involved in a repeating series of reactions that lengthens the growing fatty acid chain by two carbons at a time. Almost all natural fatty acids, therefore, have even numbers of carbon atoms. When synthesis is complete the free fatty acids are nearly always combined with glycerol (three fatty acids to one glycerol molecule) to form triglycerides, the main storage form of fatty acids, and thus of energy in animals. However, fatty acids are also important components of the phospholipids that form the phospholipid bilayers out of which all the membranes of the cell are constructed (the cell wall, and the membranes that enclose all the organelles within the cells, such as the nucleus, the mitochondria, endoplasmic reticulum, and the Golgi apparatus).

The "uncombined fatty acids" or "free fatty acids" found in the circulation of animals come from the breakdown (or lipolysis) of stored triglycerides. Because they are insoluble in water, these fatty acids are transported bound to plasma albumin. The levels of "free fatty acids" in the blood are limited by the availability of albumin binding sites. They can be taken up from the blood by all cells that have mitochondria (with the exception of the cells of the central nervous system). Fatty acids can only be broken down in mitochondria, by means of beta-oxidation followed by further combustion in the citric acid cycle to CO_{2} and water. Cells in the central nervous system, although they possess mitochondria, cannot take free fatty acids up from the blood, as the blood–brain barrier is impervious to most free fatty acids, excluding short-chain fatty acids and medium-chain fatty acids. These cells have to manufacture their own fatty acids from carbohydrates, as described above, in order to produce and maintain the phospholipids of their cell membranes, and those of their organelles.

==== Variation between animal species ====
Studies on the cell membranes of mammals and reptiles discovered that mammalian cell membranes are composed of a higher proportion of polyunsaturated fatty acids (DHA, omega−3 fatty acid) than reptiles. Studies on bird fatty acid composition have noted similar proportions to mammals but with 1/3rd less omega−3 fatty acids as compared to omega−6 for a given body size. This fatty acid composition results in a more fluid cell membrane but also one that is permeable to various ions (H^{+} & Na^{+}), resulting in cell membranes that are more costly to maintain. This maintenance cost has been argued to be one of the key causes for the high metabolic rates and concomitant warm-bloodedness of mammals and birds. However polyunsaturation of cell membranes may also occur in response to chronic cold temperatures as well. In fish increasingly cold environments lead to increasingly high cell membrane content of both monounsaturated and polyunsaturated fatty acids, to maintain greater membrane fluidity (and functionality) at the lower temperatures.

== Fatty acids in dietary fats ==
The following table gives the fatty acid, vitamin E and cholesterol composition of some common dietary fats.

	Saturated	Monounsaturated	Polyunsaturated	Cholesterol	Vitamin E
	g/100g	g/100g	g/100g	mg/100g	mg/100g
Animal fats
Duck fat	33.2	49.3	12.9	100	2.70
Lard	40.8	43.8	9.6	93	0.60
Tallow	49.8	41.8	4.0	109	2.70
Butter	54.0	19.8	2.6	230	2.00
Vegetable fats
Coconut oil	85.2	6.6	1.7	0	.66
Cocoa butter	60.0	32.9	3.0	0	1.8
Palm kernel oil	81.5	11.4	1.6	0	3.80
Palm oil	45.3	41.6	8.3	0	33.12
Cottonseed oil	25.5	21.3	48.1	0	42.77
Wheat germ oil	18.8	15.9	60.7	0	136.65
Soybean oil	14.5	23.2	56.5	0	16.29
Olive oil	14.0	69.7	11.2	0	5.10
Corn oil	12.7	24.7	57.8	0	17.24
Sunflower oil	11.9	20.2	63.0	0	49.00
Safflower oil	10.2	12.6	72.1	0	40.68
Hemp oil	10	15	75	0	12.34
Canola/Rapeseed oil	5.3	64.3	24.8	0	22.21

== Reactions of fatty acids ==
Fatty acids exhibit reactions like other carboxylic acids, i.e. they undergo esterification and acid-base reactions.

=== Transesterification ===
All fatty acids transesterify. Typically, transesterification is practiced in the conversion of fats to fatty acid methyl esters. These esters are used for biodiesel. They are also hydrogenated to give fatty alcohols. Even vinyl esters can be made by transesterification using vinyl acetate.

=== Acid-base reactions ===
Fatty acids do not show a great variation in their acidities, as indicated by their respective pK_{a}. Nonanoic acid, for example, has a pK_{a} of 4.96, being only slightly weaker than acetic acid (4.76). As the chain length increases, the solubility of the fatty acids in water decreases, so that the longer-chain fatty acids have minimal effect on the pH of an aqueous solution. Near neutral pH, fatty acids exist at their conjugate bases, i.e. oleate, etc.

Solutions of fatty acids in ethanol can be titrated with sodium hydroxide solution using phenolphthalein as an indicator. This analysis is used to determine the free fatty acid content of fats; i.e., the proportion of the triglycerides that have been hydrolyzed.

Neutralization of fatty acids, like saponification, is a widely practiced route to metallic soaps.

=== Hydrogenation and hardening ===
Hydrogenation of unsaturated fatty acids is widely practiced. Typical conditions involve 2.0–3.0 MPa of H_{2} pressure, 150 °C, and nickel supported on silica as a catalyst. This treatment affords saturated fatty acids. The extent of hydrogenation is indicated by the iodine number. Hydrogenated fatty acids are less prone toward rancidification. Since the saturated fatty acids are higher melting than the unsaturated precursors, the process is called hardening. Related technology is used to convert vegetable oils into margarine. The hydrogenation of triglycerides (vs fatty acids) is advantageous because the carboxylic acids degrade the nickel catalysts, affording nickel soaps. During partial hydrogenation, unsaturated fatty acids can be isomerized from cis to trans configuration.

More forcing hydrogenation, i.e. using higher pressures of H_{2} and higher temperatures, converts fatty acids into fatty alcohols. Fatty alcohols are, however, more easily produced from simpler fatty acid esters, like the fatty acid methyl esters ("FAME"s).

=== Decarboxylation ===
Ketonic decarboxylation is a method useful for producing symmetrical ketones from carboxylic acids. The process involves reactions of the carboxylic acid with an inorganic base. Stearone is prepared by heating magnesium stearate.

=== Chemistry of saturated vs unsaturated acids ===
The reactivity of saturated fatty acids is usually associated with the carboxylic acid or the adjacent methylene group. By conversion to their acid chlorides, they can be converted to the symmetrical fatty ketone laurone (O=C(C_{n}H_{(2n+1)})_{2}). Treatment with sulfur trioxide gives the α-sulfonic acids.

The reactivity of unsaturated fatty acids is often dominated by the site of unsaturation. These reactions are the basis of ozonolysis, hydrogenation, and the iodine number. Ozonolysis (degradation by ozone) is practiced in the production of azelaic acid ((CH_{2})_{7}(CO_{2}H)_{2}) from oleic acid.

== Circulation ==
=== Digestion and intake ===
Short- and medium-chain fatty acids are absorbed directly into the blood via intestinal capillaries and travel through the portal vein just as other absorbed nutrients do. However, long-chain fatty acids are not directly released into the intestinal capillaries. Instead they are absorbed into the fatty walls of the intestine villi and reassemble again into triglycerides. The triglycerides are coated with cholesterol and protein (protein coat) into a compound called a chylomicron.

From within the cell, the chylomicron is released into a lymphatic capillary called a lacteal, which merges into larger lymphatic vessels. It is transported via the lymphatic system and the thoracic duct up to a location near the heart (where the arteries and veins are larger). The thoracic duct empties the chylomicrons into the bloodstream via the left subclavian vein. At this point the chylomicrons can transport the triglycerides to tissues where they are stored or metabolized for energy.

=== Metabolism ===
Fatty acids are broken down to CO_{2} and water by the intra-cellular mitochondria through beta oxidation and the citric acid cycle. In the final step (oxidative phosphorylation), reactions with oxygen release a lot of energy, captured in the form of large quantities of ATP. Many cell types can use either glucose or fatty acids for this purpose, but fatty acids release more energy per gram. Fatty acids (provided either by ingestion or by drawing on triglycerides stored in fatty tissues) are distributed to cells to serve as a fuel for muscular contraction and general metabolism.

==== Essential fatty acids ====
Fatty acids that are required for good health but cannot be made in sufficient quantity from other substrates, and therefore must be obtained from food, are called essential fatty acids. There are two series of essential fatty acids: one has a double bond three carbon atoms away from the methyl end; the other has a double bond six carbon atoms away from the methyl end. Humans lack the ability to introduce double bonds in fatty acids beyond carbons 9 and 10, as counted from the carboxylic acid side. Two essential fatty acids are linoleic acid (LA) and alpha-linolenic acid (ALA). These fatty acids are widely distributed in plant oils. The human body has a limited ability to convert ALA into the longer-chain omega-3 fatty acids — eicosapentaenoic acid (EPA) and docosahexaenoic acid (DHA), which can also be obtained from fish. Omega−3 and omega−6 fatty acids are biosynthetic precursors to endocannabinoids with antinociceptive, anxiolytic, and neurogenic properties.

=== Distribution ===
Blood fatty acids adopt distinct forms in different stages in the blood circulation. They are taken in through the intestine in chylomicrons, but also exist in very low density lipoproteins (VLDL) and low density lipoproteins (LDL) after processing in the liver. In addition, when released from adipocytes, fatty acids exist in the blood as free fatty acids.

It is proposed that the blend of fatty acids exuded by mammalian skin, together with lactic acid and pyruvic acid, is distinctive and enables animals with a keen sense of smell to differentiate individuals.

== Skin ==
The stratum corneum – the outermost layer of the epidermis – is composed of terminally differentiated and enucleated corneocytes within a lipid matrix. Together with cholesterol and ceramides, free fatty acids form a water-impermeable barrier that prevents evaporative water loss. Generally, the epidermal lipid matrix is composed of an equimolar mixture of ceramides (about 50% by weight), cholesterol (25%), and free fatty acids (15%). Saturated fatty acids of 16 and 18 carbons in length are the dominant types in the epidermis, while unsaturated fatty acids and saturated fatty acids of various other lengths are also present. The relative abundance of the different fatty acids in the epidermis is dependent on the body site the skin is covering. There are also characteristic epidermal fatty acid alterations that occur in psoriasis, atopic dermatitis, and other inflammatory conditions.

== Analysis ==
The chemical analysis of fatty acids in lipids typically begins with an interesterification step that breaks down their original esters (triglycerides, waxes, phospholipids etc.) and converts them to methyl esters, which are then separated by gas chromatography or analyzed by gas chromatography and mid-infrared spectroscopy.

Separation of unsaturated isomers is possible by silver ion complemented thin-layer chromatography. Other separation techniques include high-performance liquid chromatography (with short columns packed with silica gel with bonded phenylsulfonic acid groups whose hydrogen atoms have been exchanged for silver ions). The role of silver lies in its ability to form complexes with unsaturated compounds.

== Industrial uses ==
Fatty acids are mainly used in the production of soap, both for cosmetic purposes and, in the case of metallic soaps, as lubricants. Fatty acids are also converted, via their methyl esters, to fatty alcohols and fatty amines, which are precursors to surfactants, detergents, and lubricants. Other applications include their use as emulsifiers, texturizing agents, wetting agents, anti-foam agents, or stabilizing agents.

Esters of fatty acids with simpler alcohols (such as methyl-, ethyl-, n-propyl-, isopropyl- and butyl esters) are used as emollients in cosmetics and other personal care products and as synthetic lubricants. Esters of fatty acids with more complex alcohols, such as sorbitol, ethylene glycol, diethylene glycol, and polyethylene glycol are consumed in food, or used for personal care and water treatment, or used as synthetic lubricants or fluids for metal working.

Fatty acids and their derivatives like dimer acids have also been used by scientists to prepare polyurethane coatings of bio-based or bio-derived coatings.

== See also ==
- Fatty acid synthase
- Fatty acid synthesis
- Fatty aldehyde
- List of saturated fatty acids
- List of unsaturated fatty acids
- List of carboxylic acids
- Vegetable oil
- Lactobacillic acid
