= Warmed-over flavor =

Unpleasant odor caused by meat decomposition after cooking

Warmed-over flavor is an unpleasant characteristic usually associated with meat which has been cooked and then refrigerated. The deterioration of meat flavor is most noticeable upon reheating. As cooking and subsequent refrigeration is the case with most convenience foods containing meat, it is a significant challenge to the processed food industry. The flavor is variously described as "rancid," "stale," and like "cardboard," and even compared to "damp dog hair." Warmed-over flavor is caused by the oxidative decomposition of lipids (fatty substances) in the meat into chemicals (short-chain aldehydes or ketones) which have an unpleasant taste or odor. This decomposition process begins after cooking or processing and is aided by the release of naturally occurring iron in the meat.

== Occurrence of warmed-over flavor ==
The occurrence of warmed-over flavor begins as lipids, primarily lipids from the cell membrane of cells in the meat, are attacked by oxygen. This process is aided by the release of iron from iron-containing proteins in the meat, including myoglobin and hemoglobin. The iron is released by the heat of cooking, or by mechanical grinding. The free iron then acts as a catalyst, or promoter, of oxidation reactions. The reactions break down some of the fats in the meat to form primary oxidation products. These chemicals are not directly responsible for the objectionable taste. Instead, they subsequently further decompose to secondary oxidation products including "alcohols, acids, ketones, lactones and unsaturated hydrocarbons which produce the [warmed-over flavor]." Many of these compounds, including pentanal, hexanal, pentylfuran, 2-pentylfuran, 2-octenal and 2,3-octanedione have a strong odor and can be tasted at concentrations as low as 1 part per billion.

== Prevention ==
Warmed-over flavor can be prevented by the addition of preservatives to processed meat. Many of the preservatives are antioxidants, ranging from tocopherols (related to vitamin E) to plum juice to industrial additives such as butylated hydroxytoluene (BHT), butylated hydroxyanisole (BHA) and propyl gallate. Other preservatives such as sodium pyrophosphate and sodium hexametaphosphate may work by binding iron and preventing it from catalyzing the chemical reactions which lead to warmed-over flavor; as these compounds are generally more soluble in water than the fat-soluble antioxidant preservatives, they may be more readily used to prevent oxidative decomposition in meat. Nitrites, a curing agent for meat, may prevent the development of warmed-over flavor by preventing the release of iron during cooking.

== See also ==
- Food preservation
- Rancidification
