= Carlos Monteiro =

Carlos Monteiro may refer to:

- Carlos Monteiro (runner), Portuguese athlete
- Carlos Monteiro (footballer), Bolivian footballer, see Copa Libertadores 2007 – Group 5
- Carlos Augusto Monteiro
