= Rancidification =

Autoxidation or hydrolysis of fats and oils

Rancidification is the process of complete or incomplete autoxidation or hydrolysis of fats and oils when exposed to air, light, moisture, or bacterial action, producing short-chain aldehydes, ketones and free fatty acids.

When these processes occur in food, undesirable odors and flavors can result. In processed meats these flavors are collectively known as warmed-over flavor. In certain cases the flavors can be desirable, as in aged cheeses.

Rancidification can detract from the nutritional value of food, as some vitamins are sensitive to oxidation. Oxidative degradation also occurs in other hydrocarbons, including lubricating oils, fuels, and mechanical cutting fluids.

== Pathways ==
Four pathways for rancidification are recognized:

=== Hydrolytic ===
Hydrolytic rancidity refers to the odor that develops when triglycerides are hydrolyzed and free fatty acids are released. This reaction of lipid with water may require a catalyst (such as a lipase, or acidic or alkaline conditions) leading to the formation of free fatty acids and glycerol. In particular, short-chain fatty acids, such as butyric acid, are malodorous. When short-chain fatty acids are produced, they serve as catalysts themselves, further accelerating the reaction, a form of autocatalysis.

=== Oxidative ===
Oxidative rancidity is associated with the degradation by oxygen in the air.

==== Free-radical oxidation ====
The double bonds of an unsaturated fatty acid can be cleaved by free-radical reactions involving molecular oxygen. This reaction causes the release of malodorous and highly volatile aldehydes and ketones. Because of the nature of free-radical reactions, the reaction is catalyzed by sunlight. Oxidation primarily occurs with unsaturated fats. For example, even though meat is held under refrigeration or in a frozen state, the poly-unsaturated fat will continue to oxidize and slowly become rancid. The fat oxidation process, potentially resulting in rancidity, begins immediately after the animal is slaughtered and the muscle, intra-muscular, inter-muscular and surface fat becomes exposed to oxygen of the air. This chemical process continues during frozen storage, though more slowly at lower temperature. Oxidative rancidity can be prevented by light-proof packaging, oxygen-free atmosphere (air-tight containers) and by the addition of antioxidants.

==== Enzyme-catalysed oxidation ====
A double bond of an unsaturated fatty acid can be oxidised by oxygen from the air in reactions catalysed by plant or animal lipoxygenase enzymes, producing a hydroperoxide as a reactive intermediate, as in free-radical peroxidation. The final products depend on conditions: the lipoxygenase article shows that if a hydroperoxide lyase enzyme is present, it can cleave the hydroperoxide to yield short-chain fatty acids and dicarboxylic acids (several of which were first discovered in rancid fats).

=== Microbial ===
Microbial rancidity refers to a water-dependent process in which microorganisms, such as bacteria or molds, use their enzymes such as lipases to break down fat. Pasteurization and/or addition of antioxidant ingredients such as vitamin E, can reduce this process by destroying or inhibiting microorganisms.

== Food safety ==
Despite concerns among the scientific community, there is little data on the health effects of rancidity or lipid oxidation in humans. Animal studies show evidence of organ damage, inflammation, carcinogenesis, and advanced atherosclerosis, although typically the dose of oxidized lipids is larger than what would be consumed by humans.

The free radical pathway for the first phase of the oxidative rancidification of fats.

Antioxidants are often used as preservatives in fat-containing foods to delay the onset or slow the development of rancidity due to oxidation. Natural antioxidants include ascorbic acid (vitamin C) and tocopherols (vitamin E). Synthetic antioxidants include butylated hydroxyanisole (BHA), butylated hydroxytoluene (BHT), TBHQ, propyl gallate and ethoxyquin. The natural antioxidants tend to be short-lived, so synthetic antioxidants are used when a longer shelf-life is preferred. The effectiveness of water-soluble antioxidants is limited in preventing direct oxidation within fats, but is valuable in intercepting free radicals that travel through the aqueous parts of foods. A combination of water-soluble and fat-soluble antioxidants is ideal, usually in the ratio of fat to water.

In addition, rancidification can be decreased by storing fats and oils in a cool, dark place with little exposure to oxygen or free radicals, since heat and light accelerate the rate of reaction of fats with oxygen. Antimicrobial agents can also delay or prevent rancidification by inhibiting the growth of bacteria or other micro-organisms that affect the process.

Oxygen scavenging technology can be used to remove oxygen from food packaging and therefore prevent oxidative rancidification.

== Oxidative stability measurement ==
Analysis system for the determination of the oxidation stability of natural fats and oils with the Rancimat method

Oxidative stability is a measure of oil or fat resistance to oxidation. Because the process takes place through a chain reaction, the oxidation reaction has a period when it is relatively slow, before it suddenly speeds up. The time for this to happen is called the "induction time", and it is repeatable under identical conditions (temperature, air flow, etc.). There are a number of ways to measure the progress of the oxidation reaction. One of the most popular methods currently in use is the Rancimat method.

Example of a determination of the oxidation stability of a diesel blend with 20% biodiesel (v/v) at 110 °C, measured with 893 Professional Biodiesel Rancimat.

The Rancimat method is carried out using an air current at temperatures between 50 and 220 °C. The volatile oxidation products (largely formic acid) are carried by the air current into the measuring vessel, where they are absorbed (dissolve) in the measuring fluid (distilled water). By continuous measurement of the conductivity of this solution, oxidation curves can be generated. The cusp point of the oxidation curve (the point where a rapid rise in the conductivity starts) gives the induction time of the rancidification reaction, and can be taken as an indication of the oxidative stability of the sample.

The Rancimat method, the oxidative stability instrument (OSI) and the oxidograph were all developed as automatic versions of the more complicated AOM (active oxygen method), which is based on measuring peroxide values for determining the induction time of fats and oils. Over time, the Rancimat method has become established, and it has been accepted into a number of national and international standards, for example AOCS Cd 12b-92 and ISO 6886.

== See also ==
- Deep frying § Oil deterioration and chemical changes
- Fermentation in food processing – Converting carbohydrates to alcohol or acids using anaerobic microorganisms
- Food preservation – Inhibition of microbial growth in food
- Lipid peroxidation – Reaction(s) leading to production of (phospho)lipid peroxides
- Preservative – Substance designed to prevent decomposition
- Putrefaction – Fifth stage of death
