= Convenience food =

Processed food designed for ease of preparation and consumption

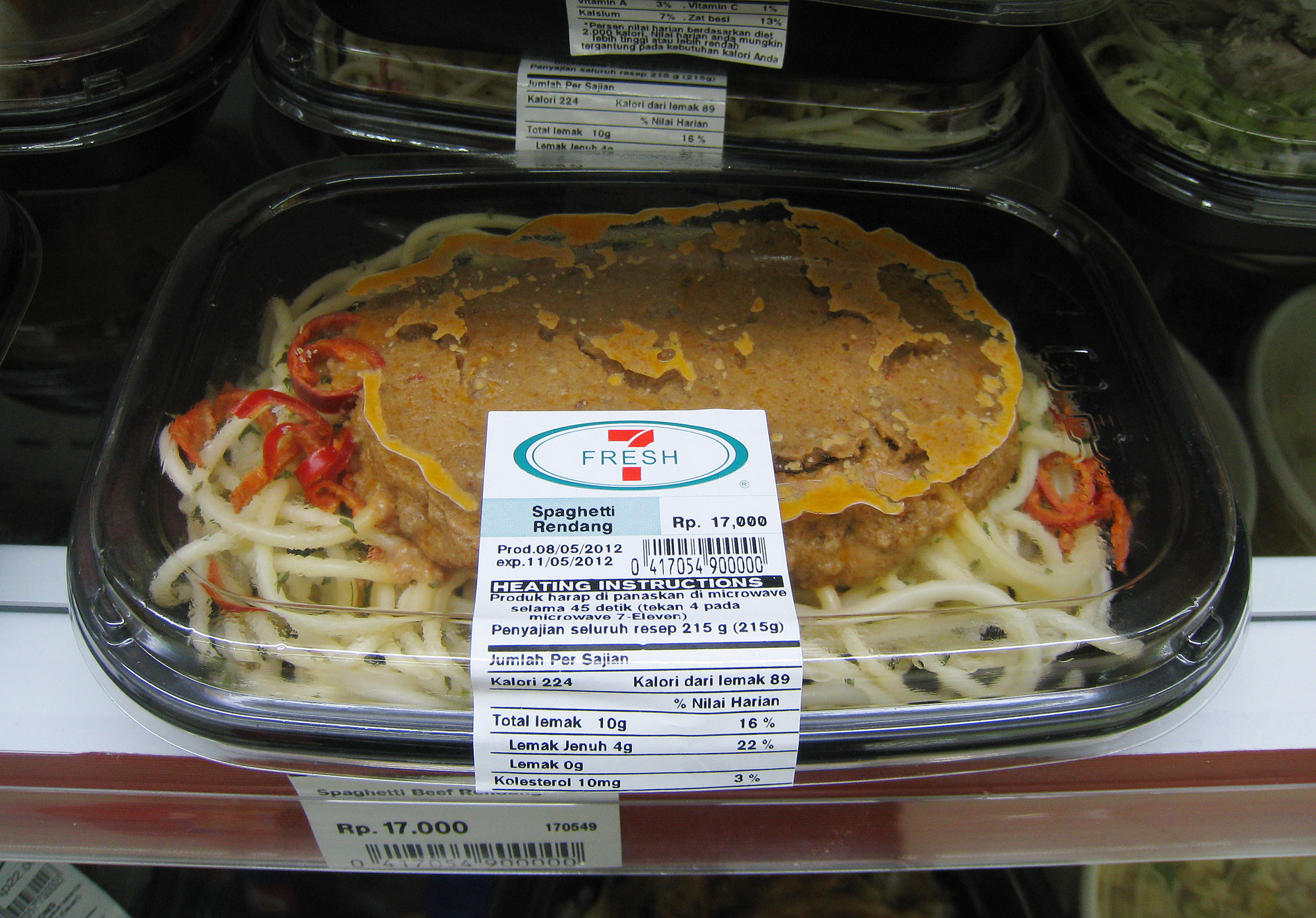
Refrigerated dinner, to be heated in a microwave oven

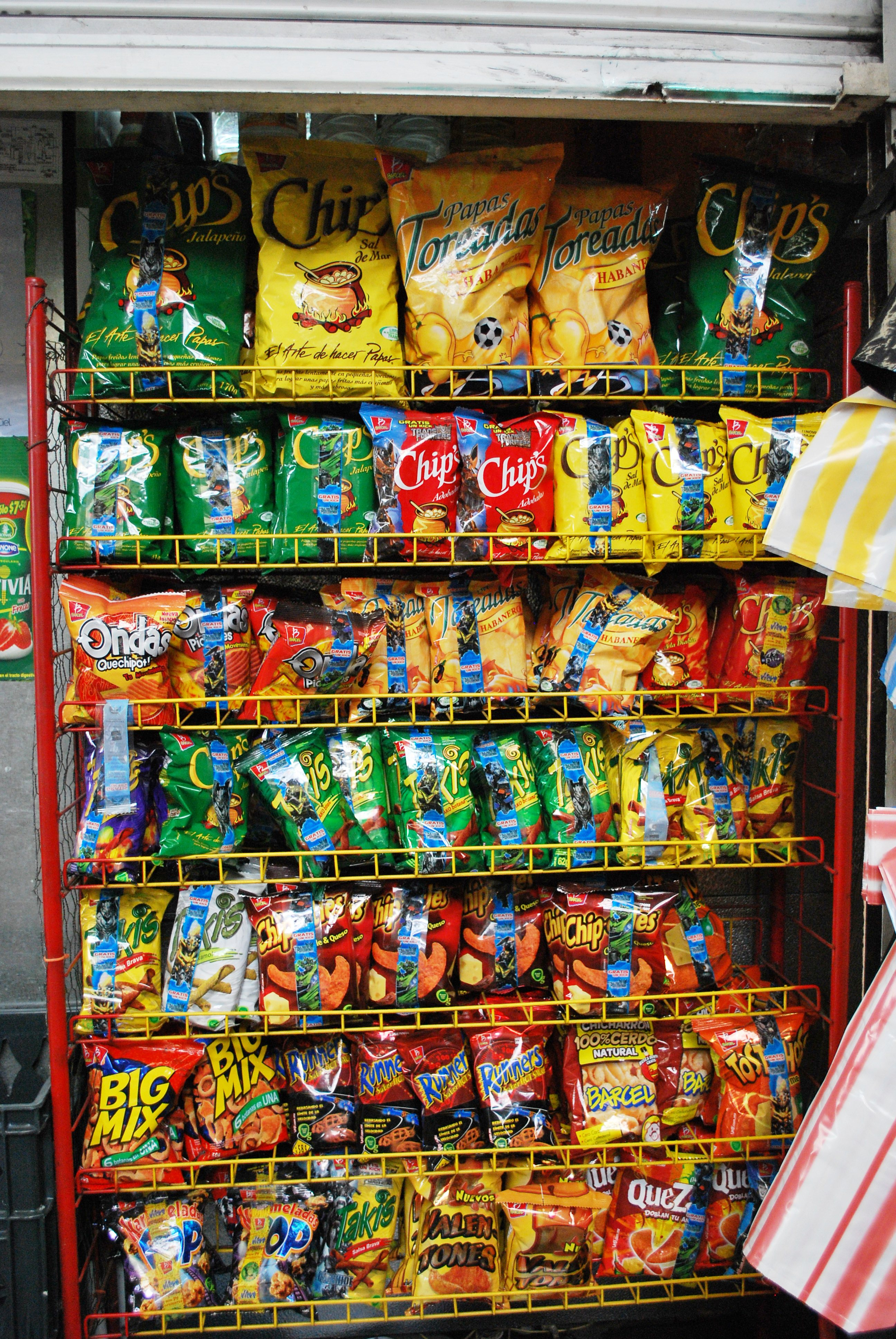
Rack of convenience snack foods

Convenience food (also called tertiary processed food) is food that is commercially prepared (often through processing) for ease of consumption, and is usually ready to eat with little to no preparation. It may also be easily portable, have a long shelf life, or offer a combination of such convenient traits. Convenience foods include ready-to-eat dry products, frozen food such as TV dinners, shelf-stable food, prepared mixes such as cake mix, and snack food. Food scientists now consider most of these products to be ultra-processed foods and link them to poor health outcomes.

Bread, cheese, salted food and other prepared foods have been sold for thousands of years, but these typically require a much lower level of industrial processing, as reflected in systems such as the Nova classification. Other types of food were developed with improvements in food technology. Types of convenience foods can vary by country and geographic region. Some convenience foods have received criticism due to concerns about nutritional content and how their packaging may increase solid waste in landfills. Various methods are used to reduce the unhealthy aspects of commercially produced food and fight childhood obesity.

Convenience food is commercially prepared for ease of consumption. Products designated as convenience food are often sold as hot, ready-to-eat dishes; as room-temperature, shelf-stable products; or as refrigerated or frozen food products that require minimal preparation (typically just heating). Convenience foods have also been described as foods that have been created to "make them more appealing to the consumer." Convenience foods and restaurants are similar in that they save time. They differ in that restaurant food is ready to eat, whilst convenience food usually requires rudimentary preparation. Both typically cost more money and less time compared to home cooking from scratch.

== History ==
Throughout history, people have bought food from bakeries, creameries, butcher shops and other commercial processors to save time and effort. The Aztec people of Central Mexico utilized several convenience foods that required only adding water for preparation, which were used by travelers. Cornmeal that was ground and dried, referred to as pinolli, was used by travelers as a convenience food in this manner.

Canned food was developed in the 19th century, primarily for military use, and became more popular during World War I. The expansion of canning depended significantly upon the development of canneries for producing large quantities of cans very cheaply. Before the 1850s, making a can for food required a skilled tinsmith; afterwards, an unskilled laborer, operating a can-making machine, could produce 15 times as many cans each day.

One of the earliest industrial-scale processed foods was meatpacking. After the invention of a system of refrigerator cars in 1878, animals could be raised, slaughtered, and butchered hundreds (later thousands) of miles or kilometers away from the consumer.

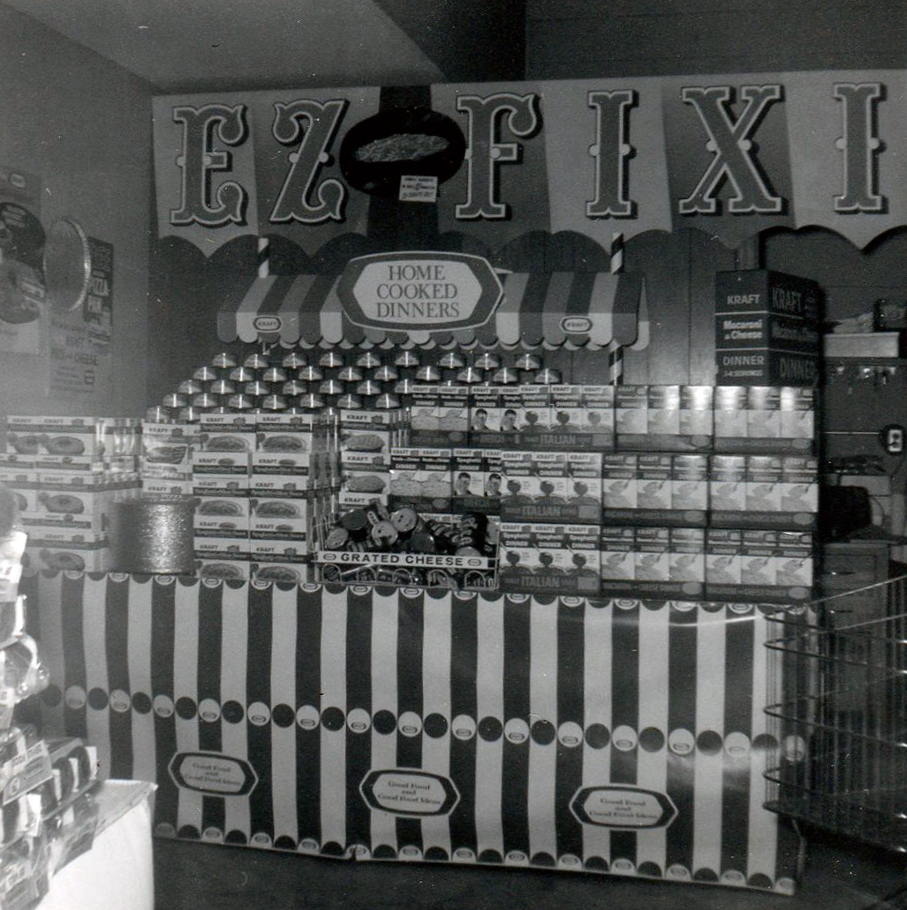
Grocery store display in 1966

Experience in World War II contributed to the development of frozen foods and the frozen food industry. Modern convenience food saw its beginnings in the United States during the period that began after World War II. Many of these products had their origins in military-developed foods designed for storage longevity and ease of preparation in the battle field. Following the war, several commercial food companies had leftover manufacturing facilities, and some of these companies created new freeze-dried and canned foods for home use. Like many product introductions, not all were successful—convenience food staples such as fish sticks and canned peaches were counterbalanced by failures such as ham sticks and cheeseburgers-in-a-can. However, this new focus on convenience foods and the use of technology in the kitchen alleviated labor that was traditionally carried out by women, and therefore meals that could be prepared quickly enabled women to exercise more control over their time, although research suggests these convenience technologies paradoxically intensify housework for women.

As of the 2010s due to increased preference for fresh, "natural", whole, and organic food and health concerns the acceptability of processed food to consumers in the United States was dropping and the reputation of major packaged food brands had been damaged. Firms responded by offering "healthier" formulations and acquisition of brands with better reputations.

== Types ==
Convenience foods can include products such as candy; beverages such as soft drinks, juices and milk; nuts, fruits and vegetables in fresh or preserved states; processed meats and cheeses; and canned products such as soups and pasta dishes. Additional convenience foods include frozen pizza, chips such as potato chips (known in Britain as crisps), pretzels, and cookies.

These products are often sold in portion-controlled, single-serving packaging designed for portability.

=== Packaged mixes ===
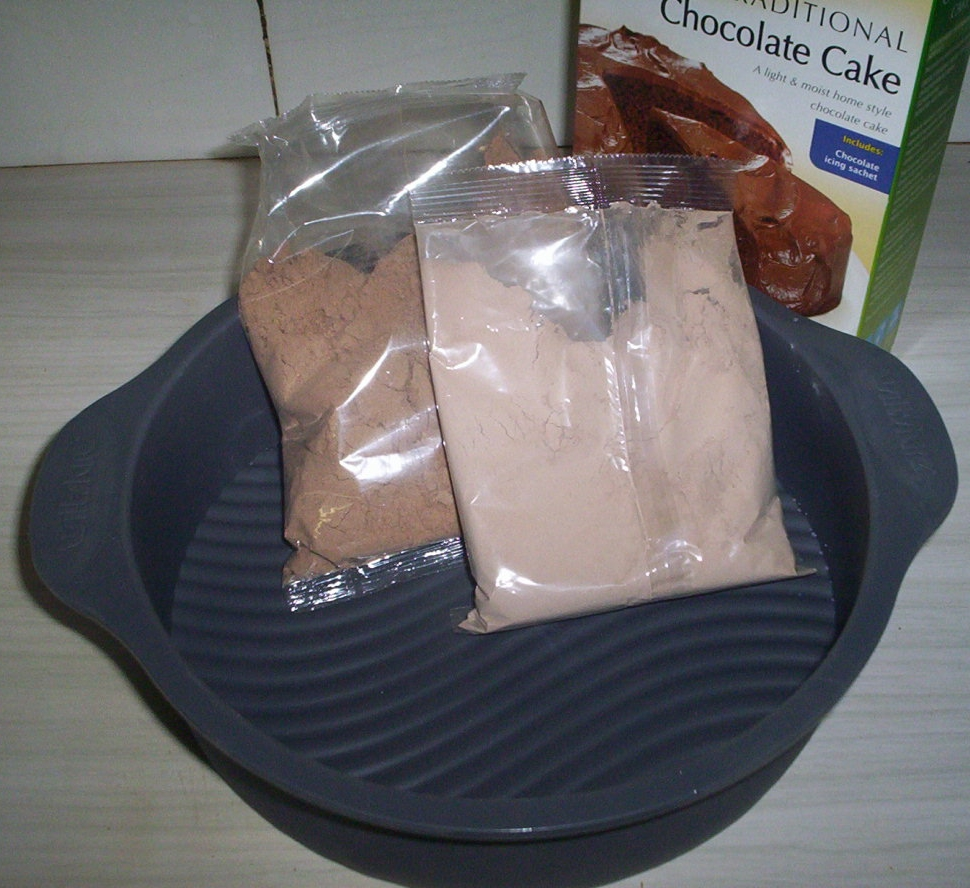
A cake mix

Gristmills have produced flour for baking for thousands of years. In more recent times flour has been sold with other ingredients mixed in, as have other products ready to cook. Packaged mixes are convenience foods which typically require some preparation and cooking either in the oven or on the stove top.

Packaged baked goods mixes typically use chemical leavening agents (commonly referred to as baking powder), for a quick, reliable result, avoiding the requirement for time-consuming skilled labor and the climate control needed for traditional yeast breads. These packaged mixes produce a type of quick bread.

Examples include baking mixes, macaroni and cheese, brownie mixes, and gravy mixes. Some packaged mixes may have a high saturated fat content.

=== By country ===
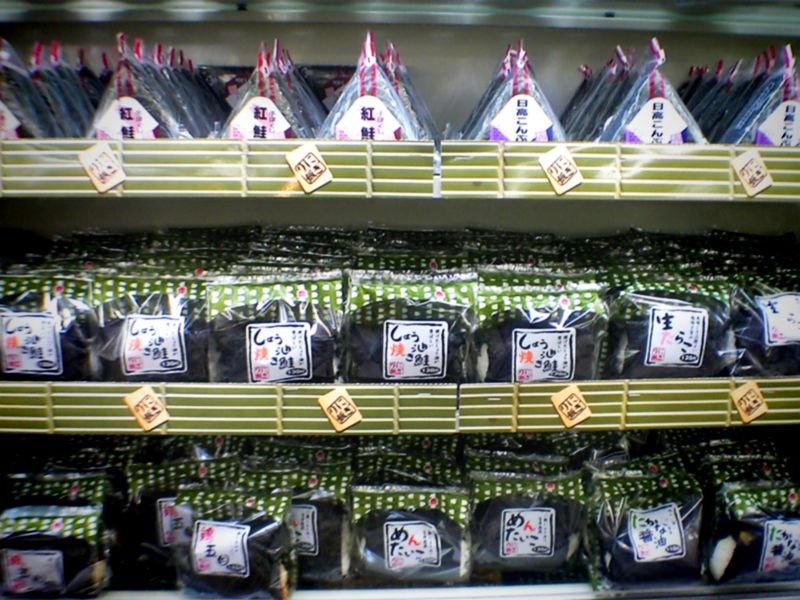
Onigiri at a convenience store in Kamakura, Japan

In 2007, it was noted in the book Australia's food & nutrition 2012 that a distinct increase in convenience food consumption had been occurring in Australia.

In the Republic of Ireland, breakfast rolls eaten by busy workers became a symbol of the Celtic Tiger economic boom.

In Japan, onigiri (rice balls) are a popular convenience food that dates for millennia — by the Heian period these were established enough to be mentioned in literature. Additional Japanese convenience foods include prepared tofu (bean curd), prepared packages of seafood and instant ramen noodles.

In the Philippines, ready-to-consume packages of traditional Filipino dishes such as sisig, adobo, and caldereta are popular products offered by convenience stores across the country.

Canned tuna packed in oil is a convenience food in the Solomon Islands.

In Russia, frozen pelmeni, a type of meat dumplings, adopted from Uralic peoples such as Komi, Mansi and Udmurts, are known from at least the 18th century, and industrially produced and prepacked pelmeni are a staple of the supermarket freezer sections.

=== By region ===
In Western Africa, processed cassava flour that has been grated and dried is a popular convenience food.

== Retail ==
In some instances, retail sales of convenience foods may provide higher profit margins for food retailers compared to the profits attained from sales of the individual ingredients that are present in the convenience foods.

A survey in 1984 attributed over one-third of funds spent by consumers for food in Britain to be for convenience food purchases.

== Environmental and health concerns ==
Several groups have cited the environmental harm of single serve packaging due to the increased usage of plastics that contributes to solid waste in landfills. Due to concerns about obesity and other health problems, some health organizations have criticized the high fat, sugar, salt, food preservatives and food additives that are present in some convenience foods.

In most developed countries, 80% of consumed salt comes from industry-prepared food (5% come from natural salt; 15% comes from salt added during cooking or eating). Health effects of salt concentrate on sodium and depend in part on how much is consumed. A single serving of many convenience foods contains a significant portion of the recommended daily allowance of sodium. Manufacturers are concerned that if the taste of their product is not optimized with salt, it will not sell as well as competing products. Tests have shown that some popular packaged foods depend on significant amounts of salt for their palatability.

== Labeling, mitigation, and regulation ==
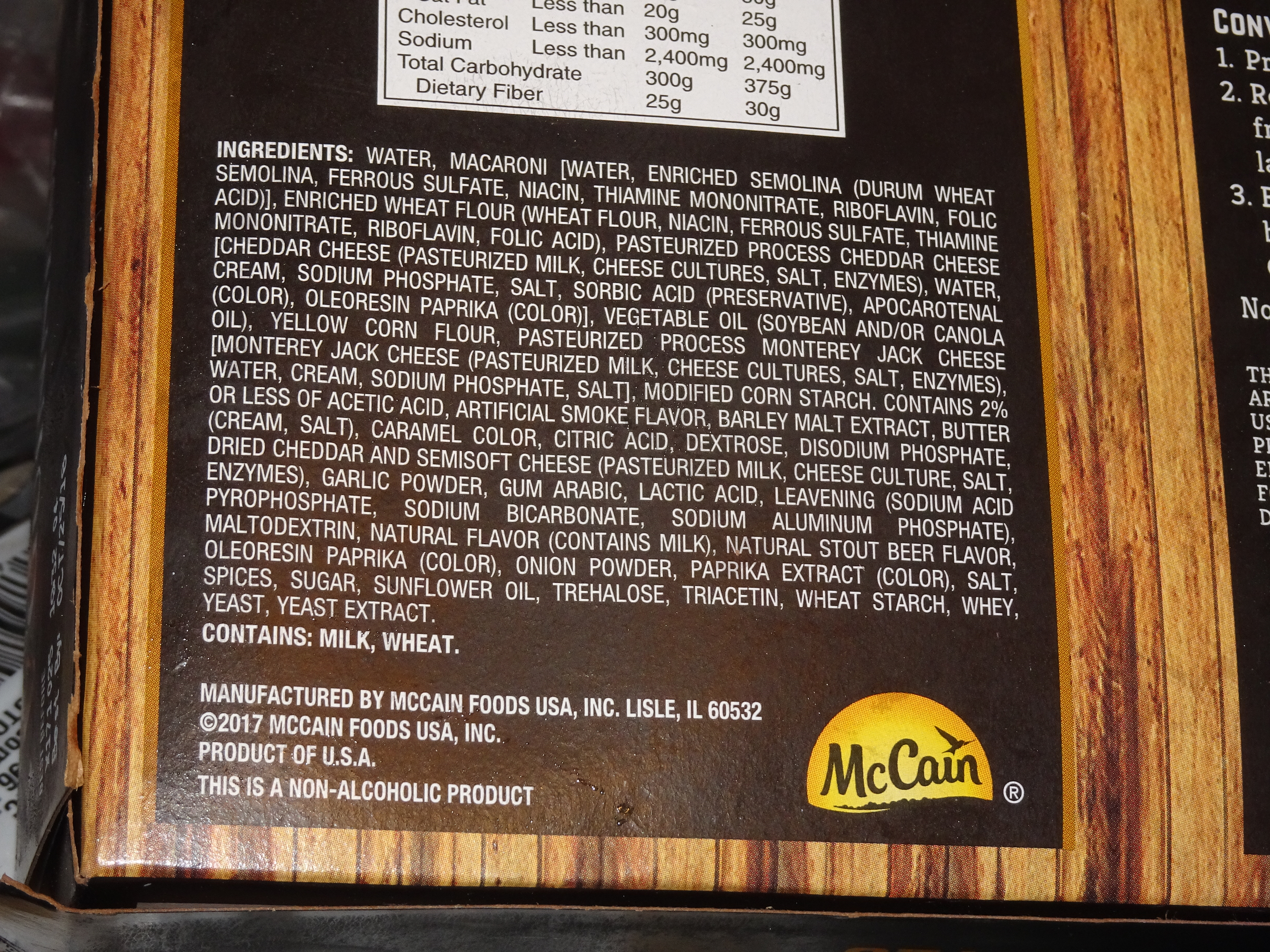
Many preservatives, salts, artificial colors and artificial flavorings are used in this highly processed frozen food item.

In response to the issues surrounding the healthfulness of convenience and restaurant foods, an initiative in the United States, spearheaded by Michelle Obama and her Let's Move! campaign, to reduce the unhealthy aspects of commercially produced food and fight childhood obesity, was unveiled by the White House in February 2010. Michelle Obama urged the industry to cut back on sugars and salts found in many convenience foods, encouraging self-regulation over government intervention through laws and regulations. Despite Obama's stated preference on self-regulation, the Food and Drug Administration announced that it was looking into quantifying the guidelines into law while other groups and municipalities are seeking to add other preventive measures such as target taxes and levies onto these products.

In response to the attention, in April 2010 a coalition of sixteen manufacturers all agreed to reduce salt levels in foods sold in the United States under a program based on a similar effort in the United Kingdom. However, the initiative met with resistance from some manufacturers, who stated that processed foods require the high levels of salt to remain appetizing and to mask undesirable effects of food processing such as "warmed-over flavor". The coalition expanded its mission in May 2010 by announcing that it intends to reduce the amount of calories in foods. By introducing lower calorie foods, changing product recipes and reducing portion sizes, the coalition stated that it expected to reduce the caloric content of foods by more than 1.5 trillion calories in total by 2012.

== Social inequality ==
As previously stated, convenience foods cover a variety of food groups and come in numerous forms. Thus, there are a variety of healthy and unhealthy convenience foods. Research such as the 2002 study by Kimberly Morland et al., have correlated inequalities between low-income communities and increased access to unhealthy convenience foods. This is mostly due to the decline of affordable grocery stores in some urban areas. Comparing low-income communities to more affluent communities, there are four times more supermarkets located in white communities than the black communities (commonly found in food deserts). As a result, the 2002 study concluded that with limited access to healthy food options in supermarkets, members within the low-income and minority communities have unequal access. A 2010 study by Dharma E. Cortes et al. also found a connection between consumption of unhealthy convenience food and minority communities. Limited access to healthy food options has resulted in an increase in obesity amongst members in these communities.

Many low-income families struggle with buying fresh fruits and vegetables and nutritional meals for their families because of the price of the products. These families are most often located in food deserts and fresh food is not readily available in their community. Thus, families resort to buying food that is high in fat, sugar, and salt because these highly processed options are inexpensive. These highly processed foods make up a significant portion of unhealthy convenience foods.

== See also ==
- Comfort food
- Convenience store
- Food desert
- Food packaging
- Food preservation
- Food processing
- Junk food
- Lists of foods
- Snack
- Ultra-processed food

== Bibliography ==
- Ensminger, Audrey H. (1994). Foods and Nutrition Encyclopedia: A-H. 1. CRC Press. Pages 463–476 ISBN 978-0-8493-8980-1
