= Hyperpalatable food =

Food that triggers the brain's reward system

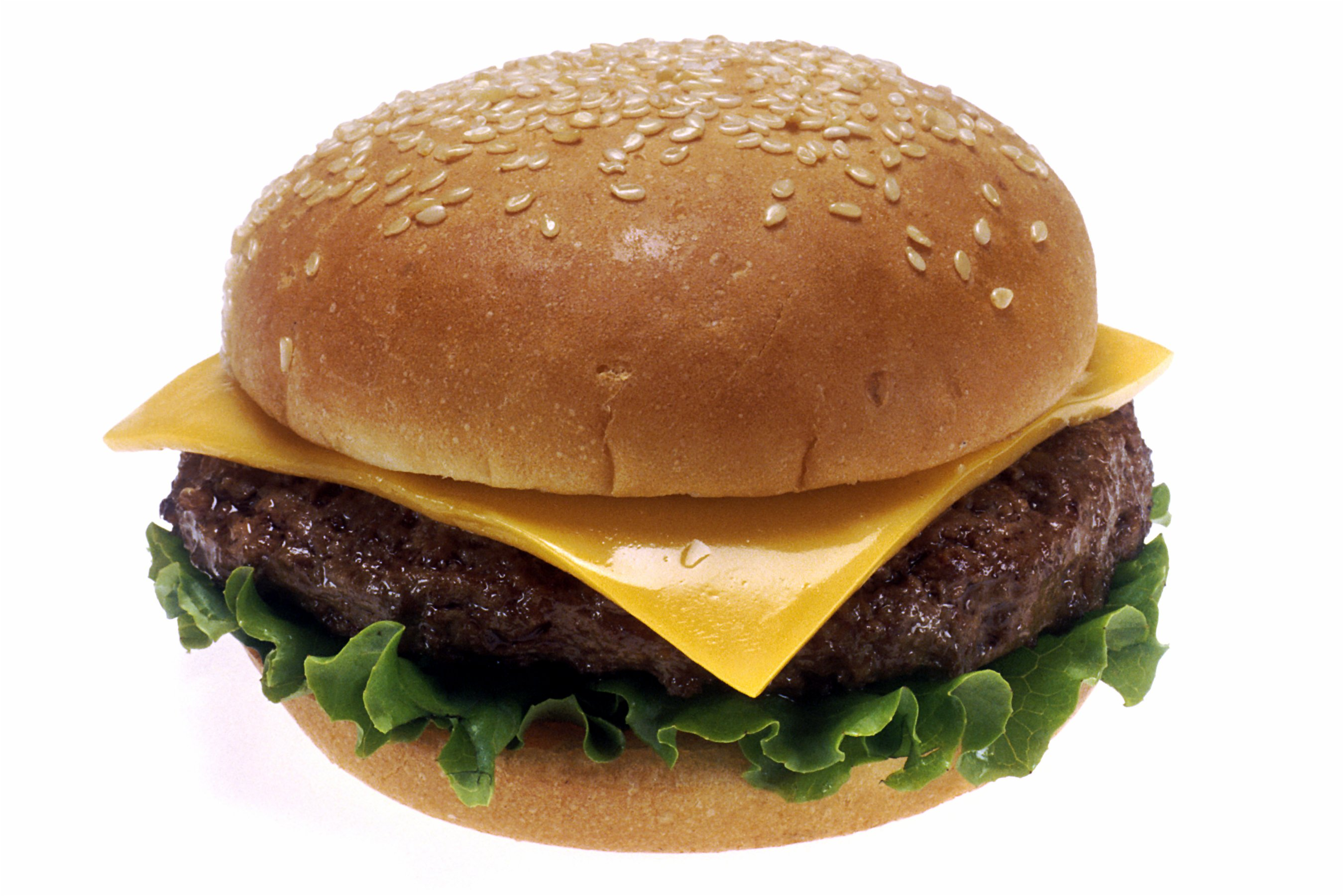
A cheeseburger contains hyperpalatable elements of carbohydrates (white bread bun), saturated fats (cheese, meat) and salt.

Hyperpalatable food (HPF) combines high levels of fat, sugar, sodium, or carbohydrates (excluding dietary fiber) to trigger the brain's reward system, encouraging excessive eating. The concept of hyperpalatability is foundational to ultra-processed foods, which are usually engineered to have enjoyable qualities of sweetness, saltiness, or richness. Hyperpalatable foods can stimulate the release of metabolic, stress, and appetite hormones that play a role in cravings and may interfere with the body's ability to regulate appetite and satiety.

== Definition ==
HPF research employs "descriptive terms (e.g., fast foods, sweets), which are not standardized and lack specificity". Researchers have proposed specific criteria for hyperpalatability based on the percentage of calories from fat, sugar, and salt in a food item. A team at the University of Kansas analysed databases from the United States Department of Agriculture to identify the most common descriptive definitions for hyperpalatable foods. They found three combinations that most frequently defined hyperpalatable foods:

1. Foods with more than 25% of calories from fat plus more than 0.30% sodium by weight (often including bacon, cheese, and salami).
2. Foods with more than 20% of calories from fat and more than 20% of calories from simple sugars (typically cake, ice cream, chocolate).
3. Foods with more than 40% of calories from carbohydrates (excluding dietary fiber and simple sugars) and more than 0.20% sodium by weight (many brands of pretzels, popcorn, and crackers).

The proportion of foods sold in the United States fitting this definition of hyperpalatable increased from 49% to 69% between 1988 and 2018.

== Neurobiology ==
Hyperpalatable foods have been shown to activate the reward regions of the brain, such as the hypothalamus, that influence food choices and eating behaviours. When these foods are consumed, the neurons in the reward region become very active, creating highly positive feelings of pleasure so that people want to keep seeking these foods regularly. Hyperpalatable foods can also modify the release of hormones that regulate appetite, stress, and metabolism.

Normally when eating a meal, appetite hormones are released from the digestive tract (e.g. glucagon-like peptide and cholecystokinin) and from fat cells (e.g. leptin), which cause feelings of fullness and communicate with the brain to stop eating. If the body has not received food for several hours, ghrelin is released from the stomach to signal hunger. Eating hyperpalatable foods too often might interfere with how the brain processes these hormonal signals so that one may feel continued cravings despite having eaten enough food. Animal studies have shown that brain signals can become disrupted when eating a very high sugar or high fat diet, which may trigger the release of hormones that reduce stressful emotions and therefore lead to a habitual desire for these foods.

== Health effects ==
Hyperpalatable foods are often high in calories, fat, sugar, and salt, and low in fibre and water. These foods can contribute to excess energy intake and weight gain, as well as impair the body's ability to regulate blood sugar and blood pressure. Hyperpalatable foods are also linked to increased inflammation, oxidative stress, and gut dysbiosis, which can affect the immune system and the brain. Consumption of hyperpalatable foods is associated with food addiction, a condition characterized by loss of control over eating, preoccupation with food, and continued use despite negative consequences.

== See also ==
- Bliss point
- Food craving
- Hedonic hunger
- Junk food
- Obesity and the environment
- Palatability
- Supernormal stimulus
