= Carlos Augusto Monteiro =

Brazilian nutritionist

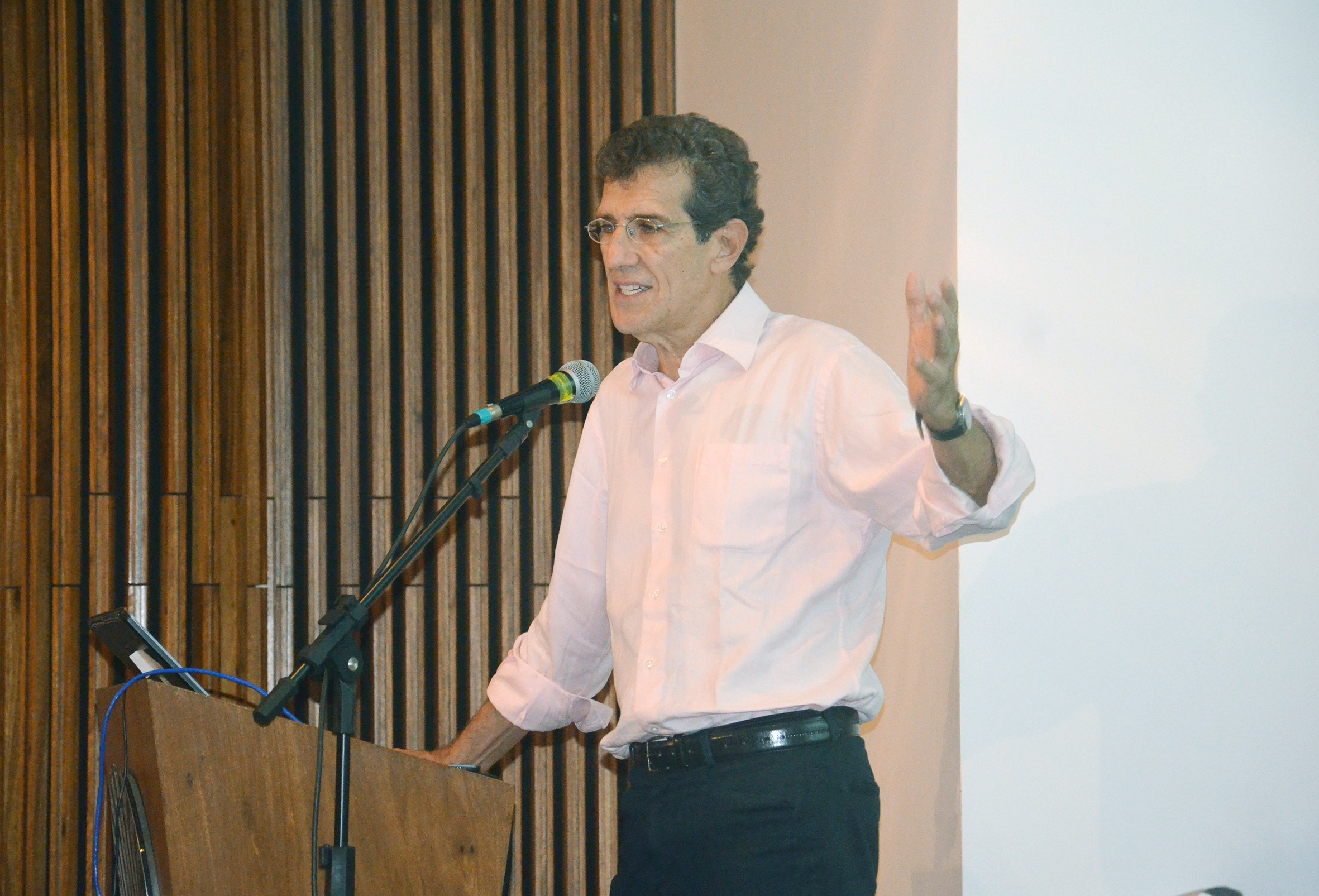
- Born: 8 March 1948 (age 78); Brazil
- Education: University of São Paulo
- Known for: Nova classification

Carlos Augusto Monteiro (born March 8, 1948) is a Brazilian epidemiologist who coined the term ultra-processed food and introduced the Nova classification.

== Education ==
Monteiro studied medicine at the University of São Paulo from 1967 to 1972. He continued his studies to obtain a master's degree in preventive medicine in 1977 and a doctorate in public health in 1979. Monteiro worked as a postdoctoral researcher at Columbia University from 1979 to 1981. He was appointed full professor at the Faculty of Public Health at the University of São Paulo in 1989. From 1990 to 1992 he worked in the nutrition department of the World Health Organization in Geneva and was a visiting professor at the universities of Bonn and Geneva. In 1992 he returned to São Paulo and has since headed the Center for Epidemiological Research in Nutrition and Health at the University of São Paulo (NUPENS/USP).

== Career ==
Monteiro's particular research interests are public health in underdeveloped parts of Brazil and the prevention of obesity and other diseases of civilization in the wake of increasing prosperity. On the second point, he and his team developed the Nova classification, which is now used worldwide to measure the increasing consumption of ultra-processed foods.

He is scientific editor-in-chief of the Brazilian public health journal Revista de Saúde Pública (as of November 2022) and was co-editor of the journals Public Health Nutrition and BMC Public Health. Since 2010 he has been a member of the WHO Expert Advisory Board on Nutrition Issues.

== Honors and awards ==
The Brazilian Academy of Pediatrics awarded Monteiro its 2006 prize in the published works category. In 2009, Thomson Reuters awarded him the Scientific Productivity and Impact Award in the social sciences category. In 2010, the Pan American Health Organization awarded him the Abraham Hortwitz Prize for Excellence and Leadership in Health Care in the Americas, which has been awarded once a year since 1975.

Since 2008, Carlos Monteiro has been a member of the Brazilian Academy of Sciences. In 2012 he became a full member of the Academy of Sciences of the State of São Paulo.

== Publications ==
The scientific literature and citation database Web of Science lists Carlos Augusto Monteiro as the author or co-author of over 260 specialist articles with an h-index of 70 and consistently lists him as a "highly cited scientist in the field of social sciences" for the years 2018 to 2022. His most cited publications include:

- Monteiro, Carlos A.; Moura, Erly C.; Conde, Wolney L.; Popkin, Barry M. (2004). "Socioeconomic status and obesity in adult populations of developing countries: a review". Bulletin of the World Health Organization. 82 (12): 940–946. ISSN 0042-9686. PMC 2623095. PMID 15654409.
- Monteiro, C. A.; Moubarac, J.-C.; Cannon, G.; Ng, S. W.; Popkin, B. (2013). "Ultra-processed products are becoming dominant in the global food system". Obesity Reviews. 14 (S2): 21–28. doi:10.1111/obr.12107. ISSN 1467-789X.
- Monteiro, Carlos Augusto; Cannon, Geoffrey; Moubarac, Jean-Claude; Levy, Renata Bertazzi; Louzada, Maria Laura C.; Jaime, Patrícia Constante (2018). "The UN Decade of Nutrition, the NOVA food classification and the trouble with ultra-processing". Public Health Nutrition. 21 (1): 5–17. doi:10.1017/S1368980017000234. ISSN 1368-9800. PMC 10261019.

== See also ==
- Nova classification
