= Food processing =

Transformation of raw ingredients into food products

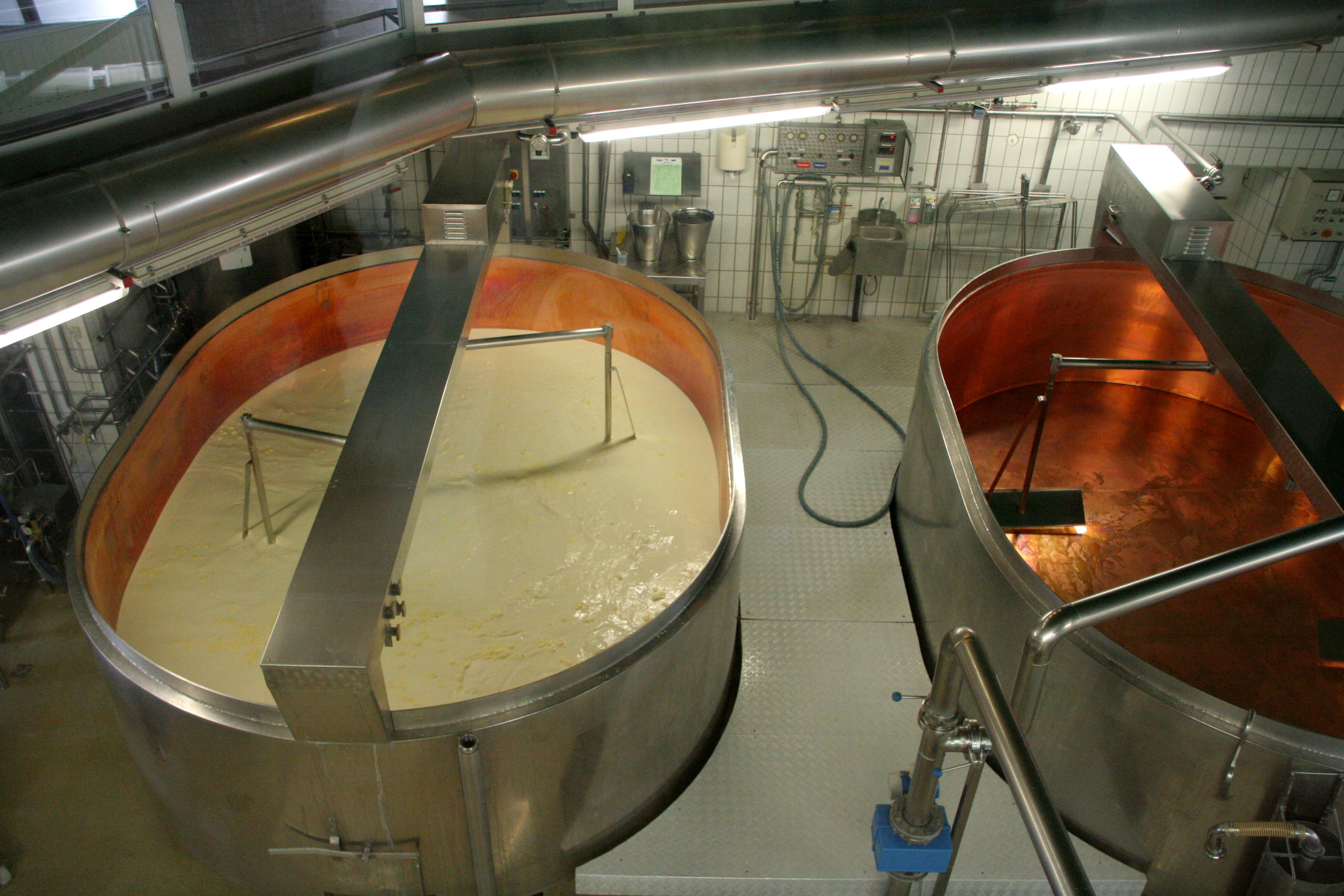
Industrial cheese production

Food processing is the transformation of agricultural products into food, or of one form of food into other forms. Food processing takes many forms, from grinding grain into raw flour to home cooking and complex industrial methods used in the making of convenience foods. Some food processing methods play important roles in reducing food waste and improving food preservation, thus reducing the total environmental impact of agriculture and improving food security.

Food Processing Levels (FPL) are defined according to physical and chemical changes occurring during food treatments. FPL are required in processed food classifications, such as the Nova classification, to categorise processed foods according to their FPL for different purposes.

Primary food processing is necessary to make most foods edible while secondary food processing turns ingredients into familiar foods, such as bread. Tertiary food processing results in ultra-processed foods and has been widely criticized for promoting overnutrition and obesity, containing too much sugar and salt, too little fiber, and otherwise being unhealthful in respect to dietary needs of humans and farmed animals.

== Stages ==
=== Primary food processing ===
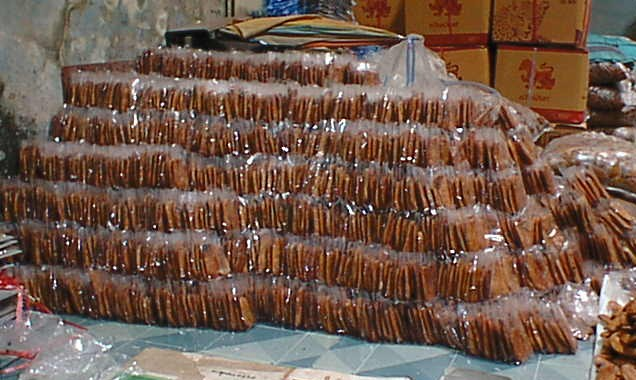
Whole, dried bananas in Thailand, an example of primary food processing

Primary food processing turns agricultural products, such as raw wheat kernels or livestock, into something that can eventually be eaten. This category includes ingredients that are produced by ancient processes such as drying, threshing, winnowing and milling grain, shelling nuts, and butchering animals for meat. It also includes deboning, cutting, freezing and smoking of animal products, extracting and filtering oils, canning food, preserving food through food irradiation, and candling eggs, as well as homogenizing and pasteurizing milk.

Contamination and spoilage problems in primary food processing can lead to significant public health threats, as the resulting foods are used so widely. However, many forms of processing contribute to improved food safety and longer shelf life before the food spoils. Commercial food processing uses control systems such as hazard analysis and critical control points (HACCP) and failure mode and effects analysis (FMEA) to reduce the risk of harm.

=== Secondary food processing ===
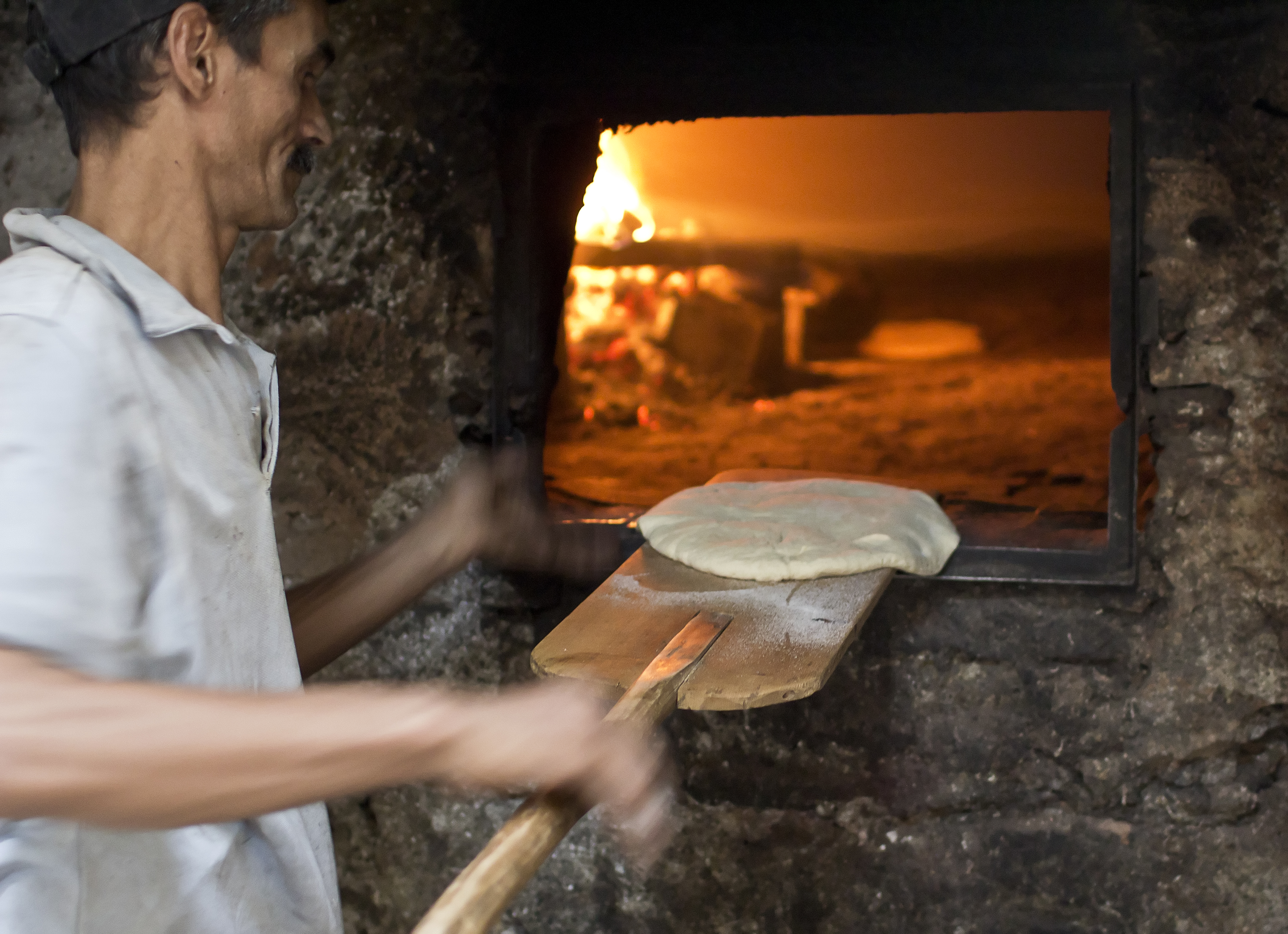
Baking bread is an example of secondary food processing.

Secondary food processing is the everyday process of creating food from ingredients that are ready to use. Baking bread, regardless of whether it is made at home, in a small bakery, or in a large factory, is an example of secondary food processing. Fermenting fish and making wine, beer, and other alcoholic products are traditional forms of secondary food processing. Sausages are a common form of secondary processed meat, formed by comminution (grinding) of meat that has already undergone primary processing. Most of the secondary food processing methods known to humankind are commonly described as cooking methods.

=== Tertiary food processing ===
Tertiary food processing is the commercial production of what is commonly called processed food. It covers further processing of multiple ingredients in the manufacturing of fabricated foods, such as the ultra-processed foods category of the Nova classification. Many of these are ready-to-eat or heat-and-serve foods, such as frozen meals and re-heated airline meals.

== Food processing level ==
Food processing level (FPL) is a parameter used for grouping of food processing according to physical and (bio)chemical changes taking place in food materials during processing. Definition of the extent of processing benefits from the use of an ordinal level of measurement. Arbitrary grouping of processed food using nominal scales, such as extent of change, nature of change, raw material sources, ingredients used, place of processing, purpose of processing, traditional, novel and other type of treatments is often criticised. Ranking of food processing at an ordinal scale at any stage from food production in agriculture to eating by consumer describes the extent of food processing using the order of the different levels of processing.

Processed food classifications often identify processing as a criterion for the grouping of processed foods. Some processed food classifications, such as the Nova classification, emphasise the role of processing in the development of obesity and noncommunicable diseases. The public health interest is particularly in the Nova category of ultra-processed foods, a highly processed foods category, which often causes controversy on whether ingredients of processed foods or food processing relate to adverse health outcomes.

=== Unit operations and unit processes ===
Food processing results in physical and (bio)chemical changes in food materials independently whether processing involves home cooking, food services or industrial food manufacturing. Food processing is typically covered by food engineering, biochemical engineering and chemical engineering disciplines. Description of processes relies on understanding physical phenomena occurring in unit operations and kinetics of (bio)chemical reactions in unit processes which form the building blocks of food processing.

Unit operations in food processing are building blocks of operations resulting in physical changes in food materials. Unit operations are governed by general physical laws and include heat transfer and mass transfer required in different operations, such as separation processes, mixing and crystallization.

Unit processes in food processing consist of unit operations and biochemical processes and chemical reactions resulting in (bio)chemical changes in food materials. In chemical reaction engineering multiple unit operations are combined with unit processes to achieve the desired chemical changes.

Unit operations and unit processes are the premise of food processing systems. Multiple unit operations are often needed to carry out food processing designed to result in physical changes. Biochemical and chemical changes during food processing, such as loss of vitamin C, can accompany intended physical modifications, e.g., during heat treatments.

There is much criticism indicating that the Nova classification refers to formulation and additives while processing levels must relate to unit operations and food processing. Food processing categories with typical processes are given in Table 1.

Table 1. Food processing categories and levels (FPL)
Processing category	FPL	Object	Result	Typical processes
Unit operations	0	Minor physical change.	Retention of natural food characteristics.	Washing, hulling, peeling, mixing, blending, forming, shaping, molding, shredding, cutting, sieving, screening, filtration, centrifugation, refrigeration, freezing.
	1	Major physical change.	Intense physical operation and disintegration of natural cellular structures.	Grinding, milling, mincing, pressing, brining, salting, churning, coagulation, gelling, emulsifying, homogenization, whipping, high pressure processing, blanching, pasteurization, aqueous extraction, concentration, membrane separations, crystallization, evaporation, distillation, steaming, drying.
Unit processes	2	General food processing but minor chemical changes.	Physical, chemical and enzymatic changes as part of food preparation, processing and traditional fermentation.	Baking, boiling, brewing, canning, cooking, grilling, frying, puffing, toasting, cocoa and coffee roasting, fermentations, yeast autolysis, simple extrusion and extrusion cooking, smoking, UHT processing, electrodialysis, ion exchange.
	3	Chemical processing.	Major chemical and compositional transformations.	Organic solvent extraction, intended chemical/ enzymatic/thermochemical transformations, irradiation, biochemical/technological processes aiming at chemical modifications.
	4	Modified constituents processing.	Formulated foods with (bio)chemically transformed ingredients.	Post-processing of food formulations with FPL 3 and 4 and other ingredients.

=== Food processing levels ===
The level of measurement in food processing classification uses nominal or ordinal variables for qualitative grouping of food processing. Processed food classifications, such as the Nova classification, categorise processed foods and often use subjective criteria in processed foods grouping. Nominal food processing classifications group food processing according to qualitative variables, such as raw material sources, purpose of processing, traditional or novel, and type of treatment. Food processing levels (FPL) are derived from ordinal scaling of food processing impact on processed foods.

Food processing levels (Table 1) indicate the object and result of food processing and provide means for the use of the extent of food processing at an ordinal scale for various purposes, e.g., processed food classification. The relative impact of FPL on the expected extent of food processing results from the combined effects of physical and chemical changes during food processing as is described in Figure 1.

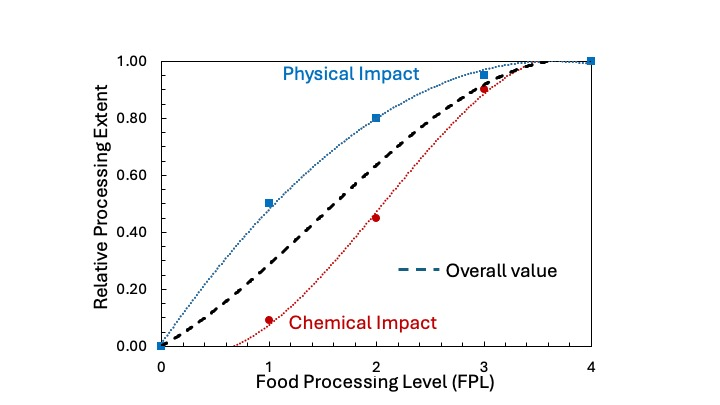
Figure 1. Expected relative food processing extent resulting from physical and (bio)chemical changes during processing at different food processing levels (FPL).

Studies of food processing impact on public health and other outcomes, such as affordability, energy efficiency, food safety and sustainability benefit from the use of FPL. Several food ingredients, which have different FPL, are often used in food products. The highest FPL used to obtain ingredients for intermittent processing of formulated foods and the FPL of final processing, whichever is the highest, indicates the FPL of the final food. Final food products may be formulated using ingredients from several FPL which, when including ingredients or processing at FPL 3 and 4, are assigned to the highest FPL 4.

== History ==
Food processing dates back to the prehistoric ages when crude processing incorporated fermenting, sun drying, preserving with salt, and various types of cooking (such as roasting, smoking, steaming, and oven baking), Such basic food processing involved chemical enzymatic changes to the basic structure of food in its natural form, as well served to build a barrier against surface microbial activity that caused rapid decay. Salt-preservation was especially common for foods that constituted warrior and sailors' diets until the introduction of canning methods. Evidence for the existence of these methods can be found in the writings of the ancient Greek, Chaldean, Egyptian and Roman civilizations as well as archaeological evidence from Europe, North and South America and Asia. These tried and tested processing techniques remained essentially the same until the advent of the Industrial Revolution. Examples of ready-meals also date back to before the preindustrial revolution, and include dishes such as Cornish pasty and Haggis. Both during ancient times and today in modern society these are considered processed foods.

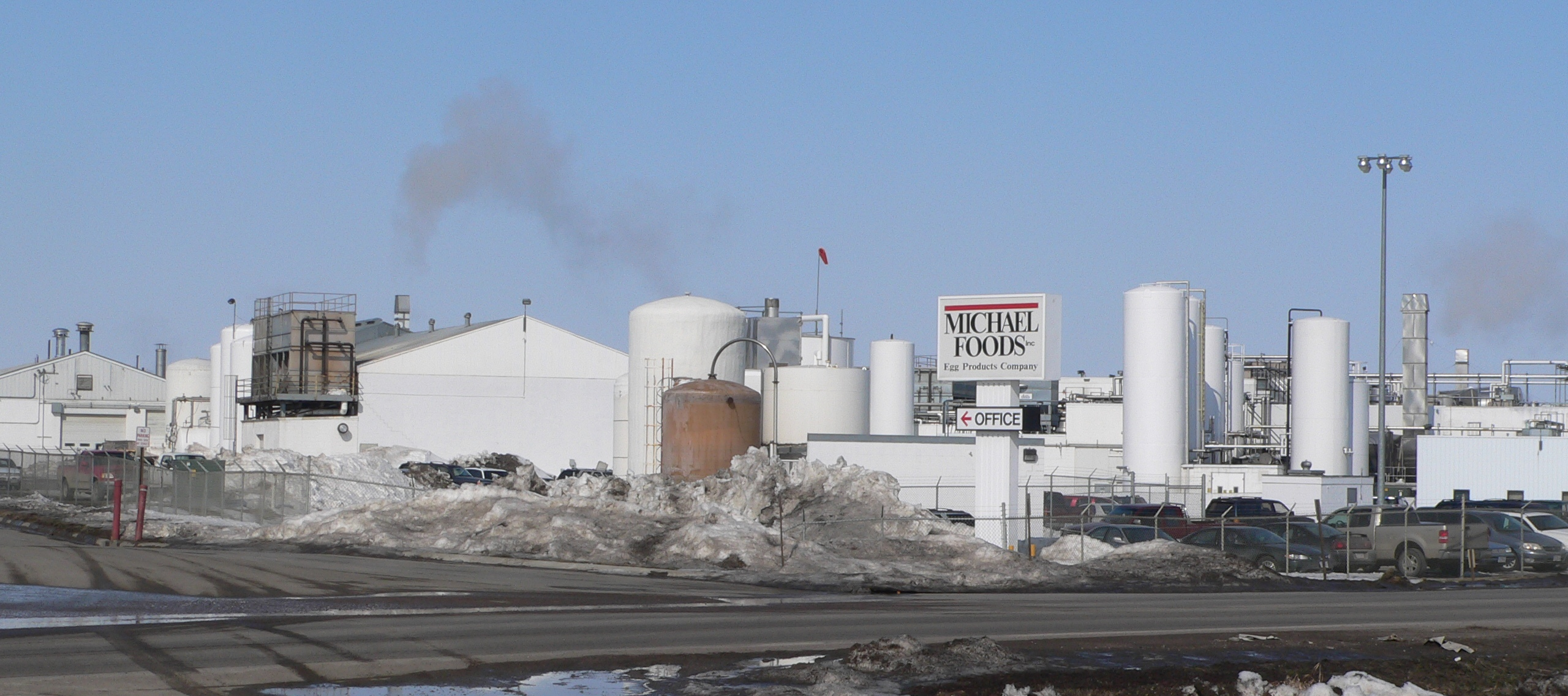
Michael Foods egg-processing plant in Wakefield, Nebraska

Modern food processing technology developed in the 19th and 20th centuries was developed in a large part to serve military needs. In 1809, Nicolas Appert invented a hermetic bottling technique that would preserve food for French troops which ultimately contributed to the development of tinning, and subsequently canning by Peter Durand in 1810. Although initially expensive and somewhat hazardous due to the lead used in cans, canned goods would later become a staple around the world. Pasteurization, discovered by Louis Pasteur in 1864, improved the quality and safety of preserved foods and introduced the wine, beer, and milk preservation. During the late nineteenth and early twentieth centuries, synthetic dyes began being used in food production to enhance or standardize the color of food products such as butter and processed goods. This reflected broad industrial efforts to control the appearance of consumer products.

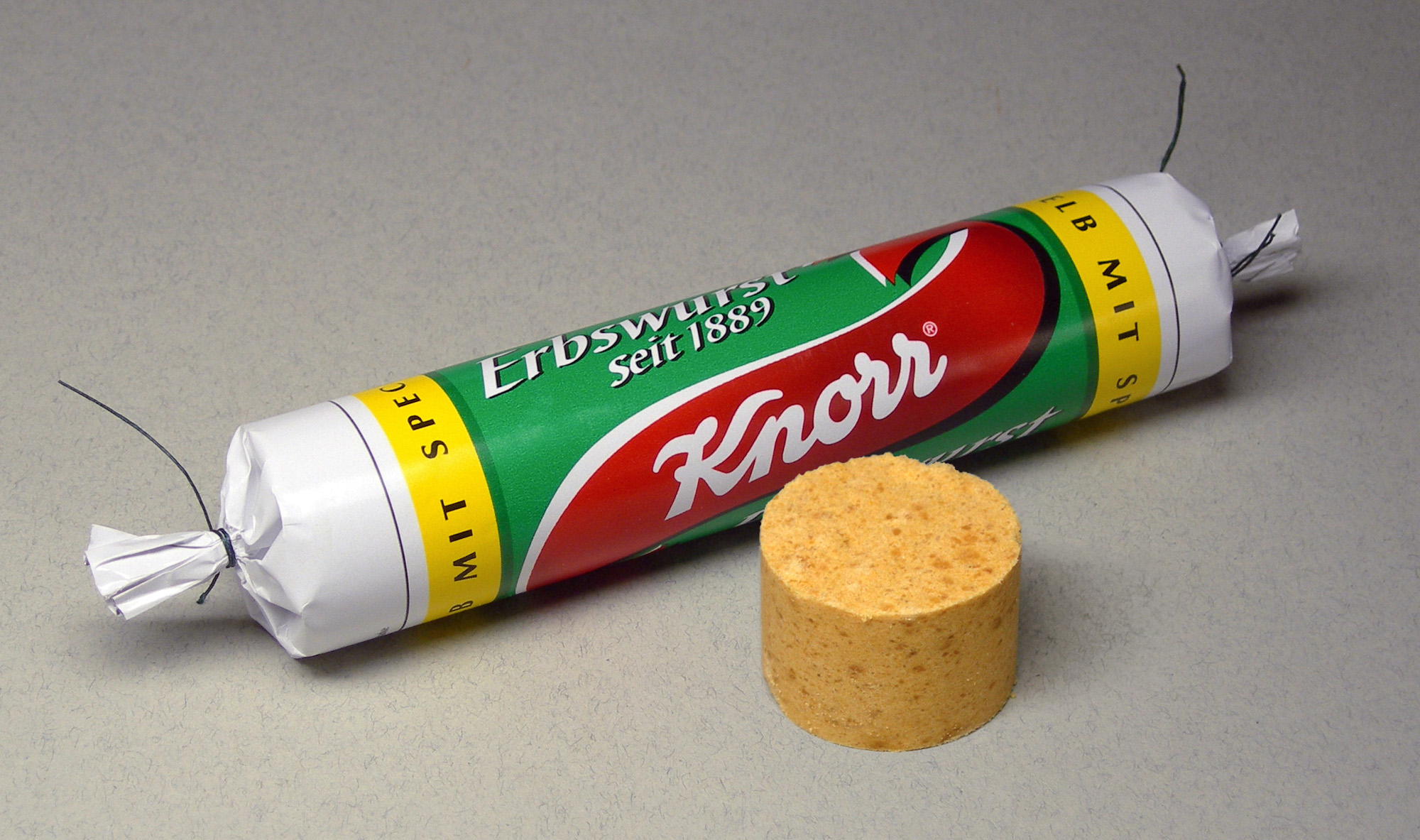
A form of pre-made split-pea soup that has become traditional

In the 20th century, World War II, the space race and the rising consumer society in developed countries contributed to the growth of food processing with such advances as spray drying, evaporation, juice concentrates, freeze drying and the introduction of artificial sweeteners, colouring agents, and such preservatives as sodium benzoate. In the late 20th century, products such as dried instant soups, reconstituted fruits and juices, and self cooking meals such as MRE food ration were developed. By the 20th century, automatic appliances like microwave oven, blender, and rotimatic paved way for convenience cooking.

In western Europe and North America, the second half of the 20th century witnessed a rise in the pursuit of convenience. Food processing companies marketed their products especially towards middle-class working wives and mothers. Frozen foods (often credited to Clarence Birdseye) found their success in sales of juice concentrates and "TV dinners". Processors utilised the perceived value of time to appeal to the postwar population, and this same appeal contributes to the success of convenience foods today.

Also in the late 20th century, food manufacturers began changing their product model from a single "platonic dish", such as one version of jarred spaghetti sauce, to offering multiple variations, such as a plain version, a spicy version, and a chunky version.

== Benefits and drawbacks ==
=== Benefits ===
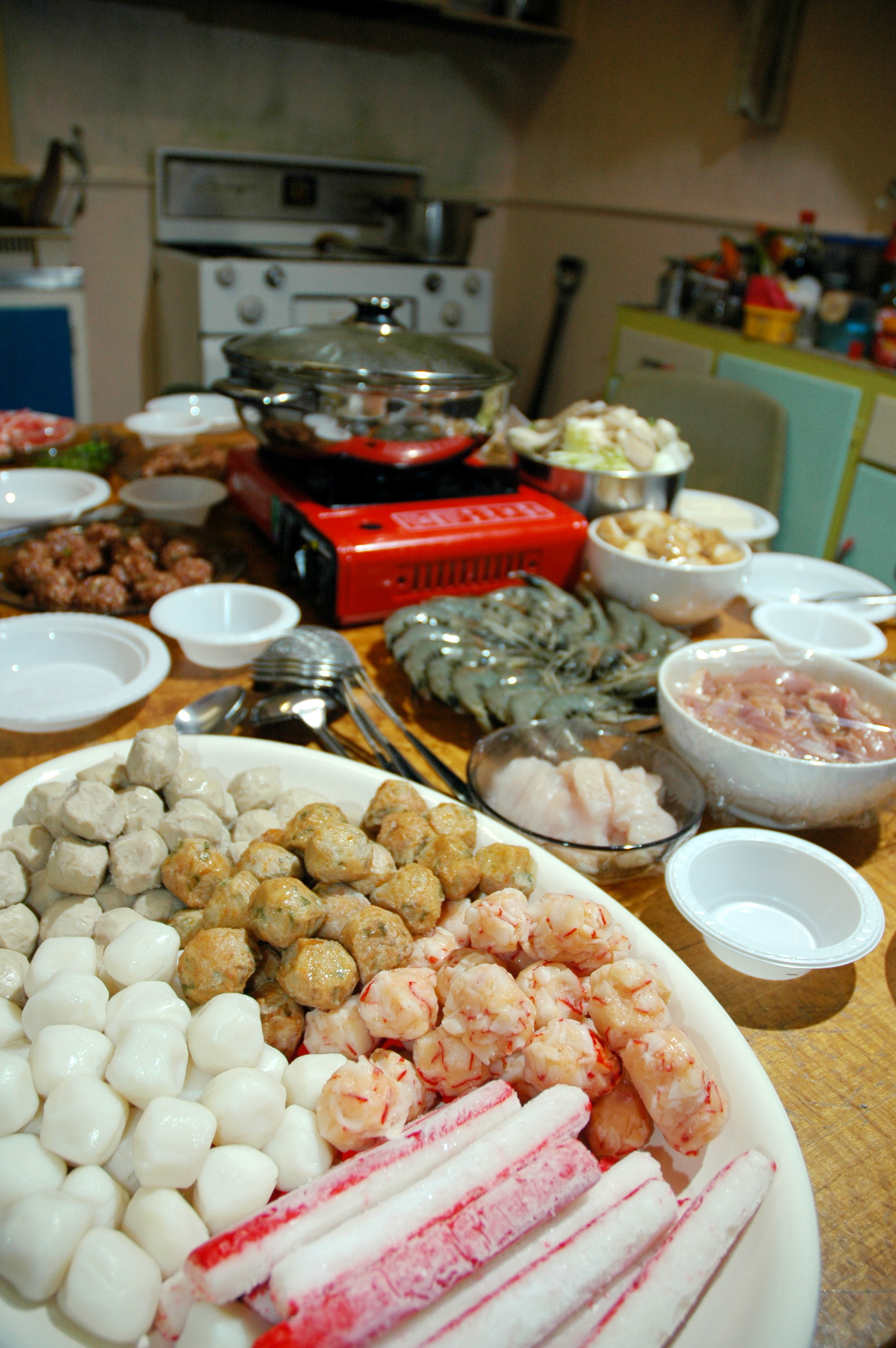
Processed seafood – fish, squid, prawn balls and simulated crab sticks (surimi)

Benefits of food processing include toxin removal, preservation, easing marketing and distribution tasks, and increasing food consistency. In addition, it increases yearly availability of many foods, enables transportation of delicate perishable foods across long distances and makes many kinds of foods safe to eat by de-activating spoilage and pathogenic micro-organisms.Modern supermarkets would not exist without modern food processing techniques, and long voyages would not be possible.

Processed foods are usually less susceptible to early spoilage than fresh foods and are better suited for long-distance transportation from the source to the consumer. When they were first introduced, some processed foods helped to alleviate food shortages and improved the overall nutrition of populations as it made many new foods available to the masses.

Processing can also reduce the incidence of food-borne disease. Fresh materials, such as fresh produce and raw meats, are more likely to harbour pathogenic micro-organisms (e.g. Salmonella) capable of causing serious illnesses.

The varied modern diet is possible on a wide scale because of food processing. Transportation of more exotic foods, as well as the elimination of much hard labor gives the modern eater easy access to a wide variety of food unimaginable to their ancestors.

The act of processing can often improve the taste of food significantly.

Mass production of food is much cheaper overall than individual production of meals from raw ingredients. Therefore, a large profit potential exists for the manufacturers and suppliers of processed food products. Individuals may see a benefit in convenience, but rarely see any direct financial cost benefit in using processed food as compared to home preparation.

Processed food freed people from the large amount of time involved in preparing and cooking "natural" unprocessed foods. The increase in free time allows people much more choice in life style than previously allowed. In many families the adults are working away from home and therefore there is little time for the preparation of food based on fresh ingredients. The food industry offers products that fulfill many different needs: e.g. fully prepared ready meals that can be heated up in the microwave oven within a few minutes.

Modern food processing also improves the quality of life for people with allergies, diabetics, and other people who cannot consume some common food elements. Food processing can also add extra nutrients such as vitamins.

=== Drawbacks ===
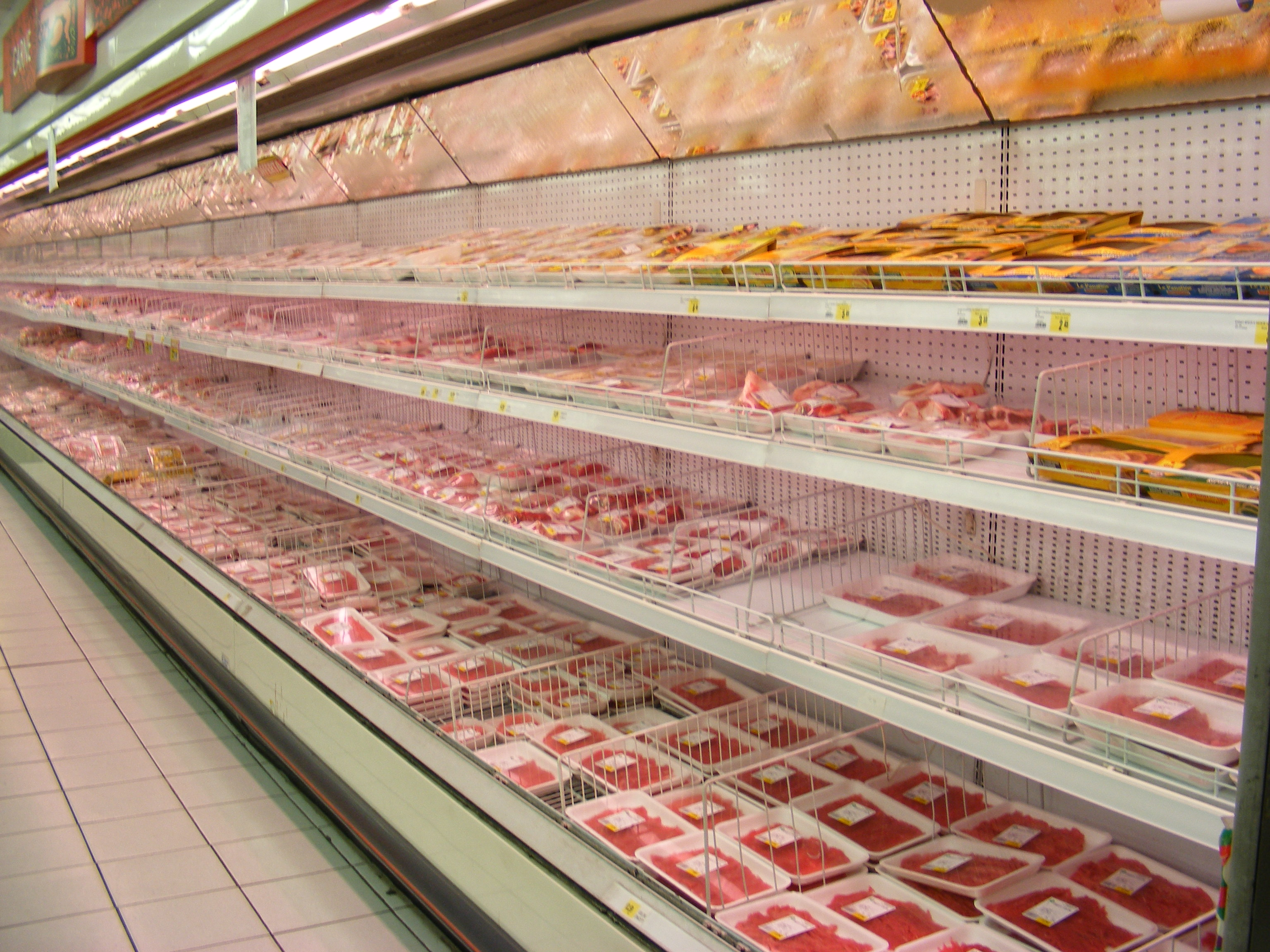
Meat packages in a Roman supermarket

Processing of food can decrease its nutritional density. The amount of nutrients lost depends on the food and processing method. For example, heat destroys vitamin C. Therefore, canned fruits possess less vitamin C than their fresh alternatives. The USDA conducted a study of nutrient retention in 2004, creating a table of foods, levels of preparation, and nutrition.

New research highlighting the importance to human health of a rich microbial environment in the intestine indicates that abundant food processing (not fermentation of foods) endangers that environment.

==== Added sodium ====
One of the main sources for sodium in the diet is processed foods. Sodium, mostly in the form of sodium chloride, i.e. salt, is added to prevent spoilage, add flavor and enhance the texture of these foods. Americans consume an average of 3436 milligrams of sodium per day, which is higher than the recommended limit of 2300 milligrams per day for healthy people, and more than twice the limit of 1500 milligrams per day for those at increased risk for heart disease.

==== Added sugars ====
While it is not necessary to limit the sugars found naturally in whole, unprocessed foods like fresh fruit, eating too much added sugar found in many processed foods increases the risk of heart disease, obesity, cavities and Type 2 diabetes. The American Heart Association recommends women limit added sugars to no more than 420 kilojoules (100 kilocalories), or 25 grams, and men limit added sugars to no more than 650 kJ (155 kcal), or about 38.75 grams, per day. Currently, Americans consume an average of 1,490 kJ (355 kcal) from added sugars each day.

==== Nutrient losses ====
Processing foods often involves nutrient losses, which can make it harder to meet the body's needs if these nutrients are not added back through fortification or enrichment. For example, using high heat during processing can cause vitamin C losses. Another example is refined grains, which have less fiber, vitamins and minerals than whole grains. Eating refined grains, such as those found in many processed foods, instead of whole grains may increase the risk for high cholesterol, diabetes and obesity, according to a study published in "The American Journal of Clinical Nutrition" in December 2007.

==== Trans fats ====
Trans fats are naturally occurring in meat and dairy products produced from ruminants, and may be found in foods that have undergone processing, including some commercial baked goods, desserts, margarine, frozen pizza, microwave popcorn and coffee creamers, at increased levels. This is the most unhealthy type of fat, and may increase risk for high cholesterol, heart disease and stroke. The 2010 Dietary Guidelines for Americans recommends keeping trans fat intake as low as possible.

==== Other potential disadvantages ====
Processed foods may actually take less energy to digest than whole foods, according to a study published in "Food & Nutrition Research" in 2010, meaning more of their food energy content is retained within the body. Processed foods also tend to be more allergenic than whole foods, according to a June 2004 "Current Opinion in Allergy and Clinical Immunology" article. Although the preservatives and other food additives used in many processed foods are generally recognized as safe, a few may cause problems for some individuals, including sulfites, artificial sweeteners, artificial colors and flavors, sodium nitrate, BHA and BHT, olestra, caffeine and monosodium glutamate — a flavor enhancer.

== Performance parameters for food processing ==
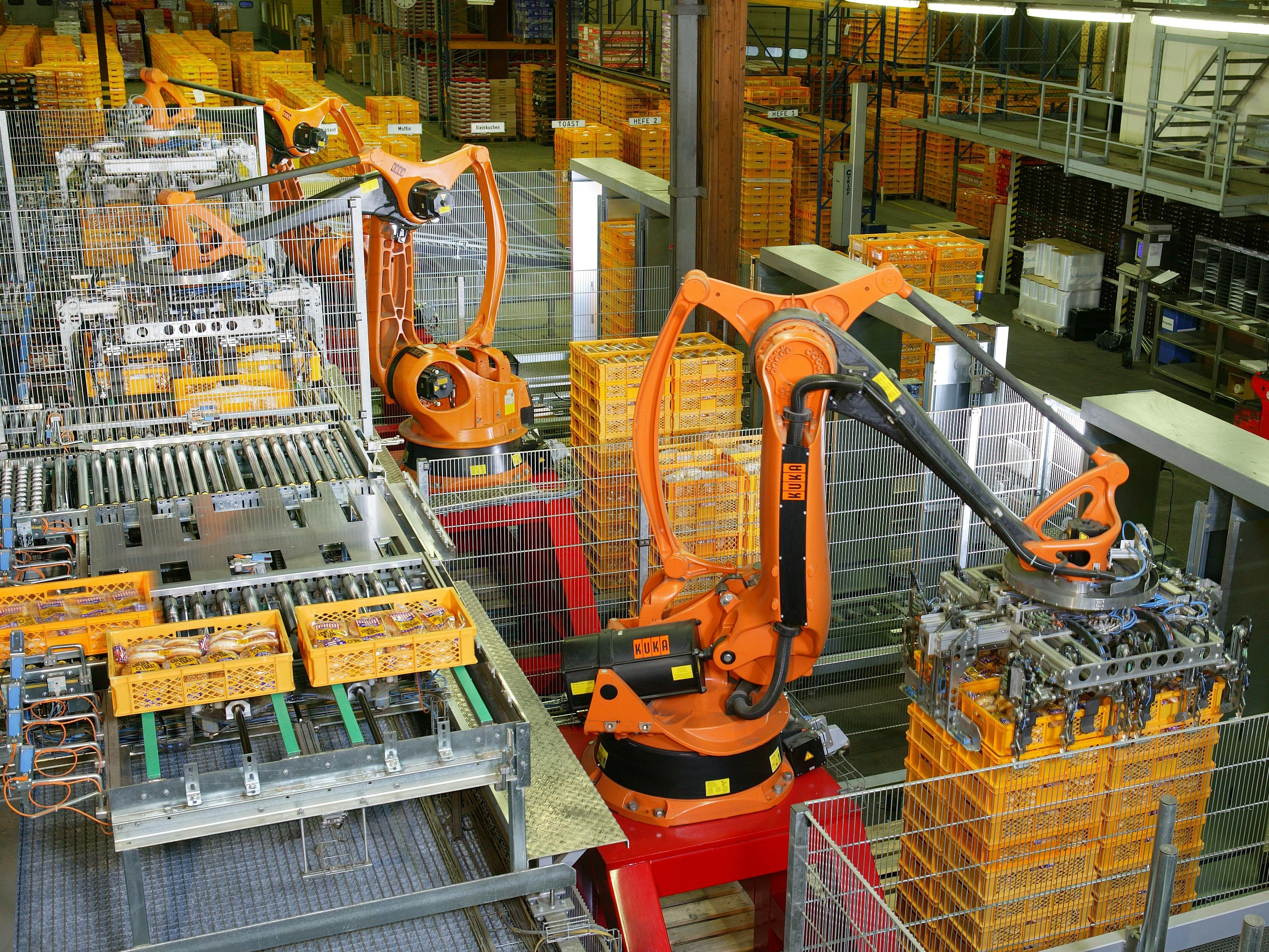
Factory automation - robotics palettizing bread

When designing processes for the food industry the following performance parameters may be taken into account:

- Hygiene, e.g. measured by number of micro-organisms per mL of finished product.
- Energy efficiency measured e.g. by "tonnes of steam per ton of sugar produced".
- Minimization of waste, measured e.g. by "percentage of peeling loss during the peeling of potatoes".
- Labour used, measured e.g. by "number of working hours per ton of finished product".
- Minimization of cleaning stops measured e.g. by "number of hours between cleaning stops".

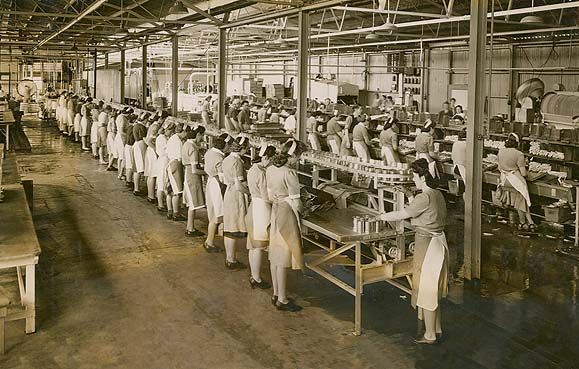
Women working in a cannery

== Industries ==
Food processing industries and practices include the following:

- Cannery
- Fish processing
- Food packaging plant
- Industrial rendering
- Meat packing plant
- Potato processing industry
- Slaughterhouse
- Sugar industry

== See also ==
- Brewery
- Canning
- Clean-in-place
- Dietary supplement
- Enzyme
- Flavoring
- Food additive
- Food and Bioprocess Technology
- Food coloring
- Food extrusion
- Food fortification
- Food quality
- Food rheology
- Food safety
- Food science
- Food storage
- Genetically modified food
- Good manufacturing practice
- List of cooking techniques
- Material handling
- Nutraceutical
- Pasteurization
- Pink slime
- Shelf life
- Snap freezing
- Ultra-high temperature processing
- Ultra-processed food
- Washdown

== Bibliography ==
- Fábricas de alimentos, 9th edition (in Spanish).
- Nutritional evaluation of food processing,
- Food preservation 2nd edition, by Norman W. Desrosier.
