= Nutrient profiling =

Nutrient profiling, also nutritional profiling, is the science of classifying or ranking foods by their nutritional composition in order to promote health and prevent disease. A common use of nutrient profiling is in the creation of nutritional rating systems to help consumers identify nutritious food.

A variety of nutrient profile models have been developed by academics, health organizations, national governments and the food industry. The development or selection of a model to use in food policy decisions is important, as different models can lead to different classifications of the same foods.

== See also ==
- Junk food
- Nutrition facts label
