= Rahul Kamerkar =

Indian lawyer and author (born 1990)

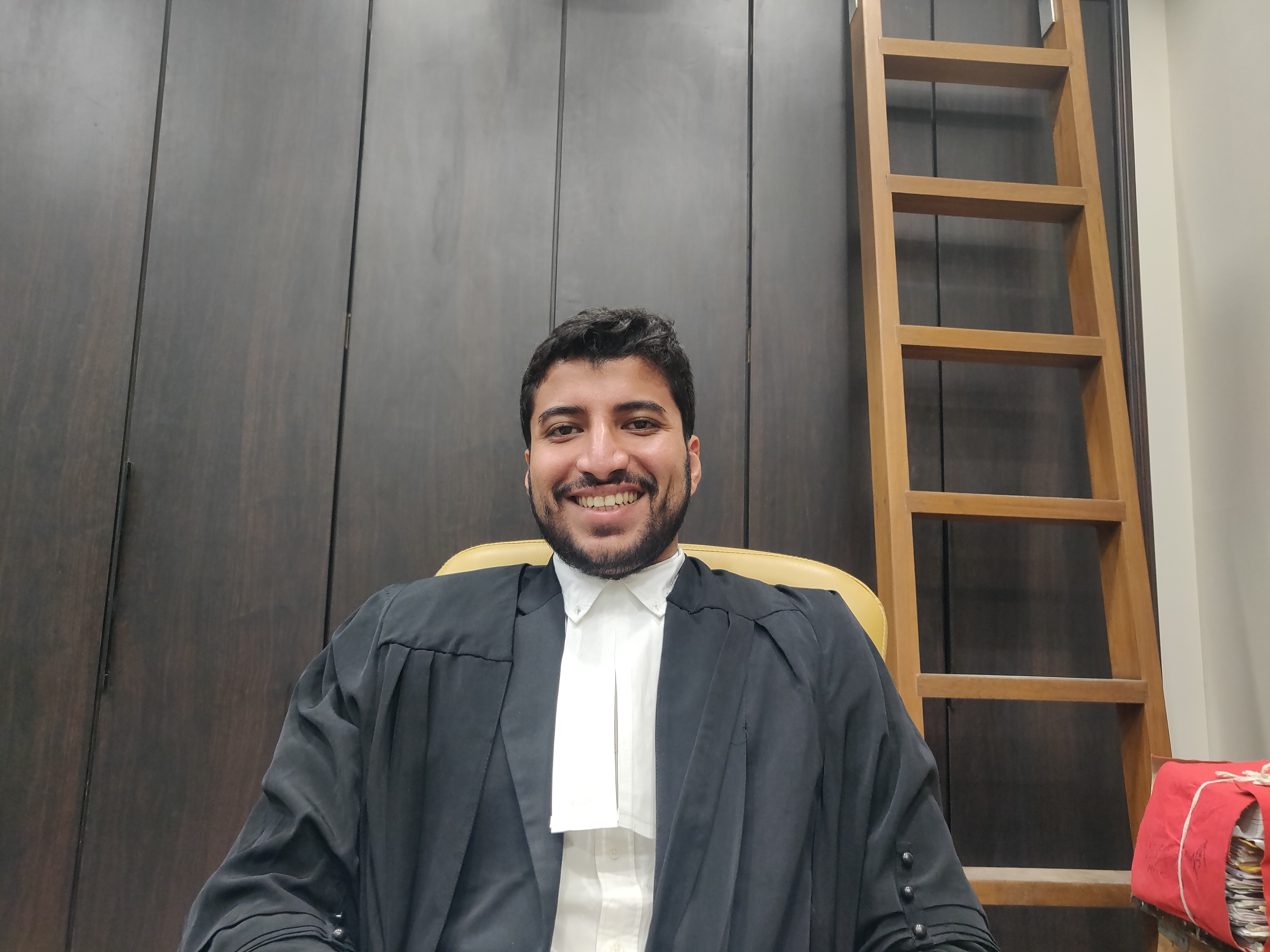
- Born: 12 December 1990 (age 35)
- Education: Mithibai College, Jitendra Chauhan College of Law.
- Occupation: Lawyer

Rahul Kamerkar (born December 12, 1990) is an Indian lawyer and author.

== Background and education ==
Born and raised in Mumbai, Kamerkar passed through Jamnabai Narsee School in Mumbai, Maharashtra. He holds a Bachelors of Arts (B.A.) in Economics from Mithibai College. He later studied law at Jitendra Chauhan College of Law.

== Career ==
Kamerkar specialises in white-collar crimes and financial disputes. He was enrolled as an advocate with the High Court of Bombay on 22 August 2015. Ever since then, he has been practicing as an advocate at the High Court of Bombay, Supreme Court of India, and Tribunals especially the NCLT Mumbai. Doing Intellectual Property, Commercial, Business, Land, Tax, and Insolvency Litigation.

In his youth, Kamerkar was involved in Indian politics as an associate with the Congress Party and had authored a book titled The Man’s Ultimate Guide to Popularity published by Hay House Publishers. He has since represented various political leaders and political parties from across the aisle in the High Court of Bombay and Supreme Court of India.

== Notable cases ==
- Bhai Jagtap v.s. Arnab Goswami
- Maharashtra Regional and Town Planning Act Amendments
- Aadhaar - Pan Linking
- Jet Airways Resolution Process
- Validity of Section 36(4) of The Industrial Disputes Act
- Lawyers Collective, Indira Jaising, and Anand Grover
- Right to Protest in Mumbai
- Bharat Petroleum All India Strike Matter
- Permanency of employment for 2700 Sanitation Workers
- Lakhan Bhaiya Fake Encounter Case
- General Motors India Closure Settlement Case
- Right of Workmen to Cancel Recognition of Union
- Congress Party and Political Matters
- Maharashtra Fishermen v.s. Commercial Trawling
- T.B. Drugs Patents Case (Compulsory Licensing of Bedaquiline & Delamanid)
- Shapoorji Pallonji Group - Pledging of Tata Shares
- Invesco vs ZEEL, Punit Goenka
- Antrix vs. Devas
- Future-Amazon-Reliance Dispute
- Tata Motors Case
- GoAir Corporate Insolvency Resolution Process
- Enforcement Directorate vs Police Commissioner of Mumbai
- Starting of the Andheri ESIC Hospital
- Ex-DGP Sanjay Pandey v.s. State of Maharashtra
- NEET Medical Students Admissions Case

== Pinky Promise ==
Kamerkar is an investor and non-executive director in the Wharton incubated company Pinky Promise Pvt. Ltd.

== See also ==
- Bombay High Court
- Supreme Court of India
- National Company Law Tribunal
