= Junk food =

Unhealthy food high in salt, sugar or fat

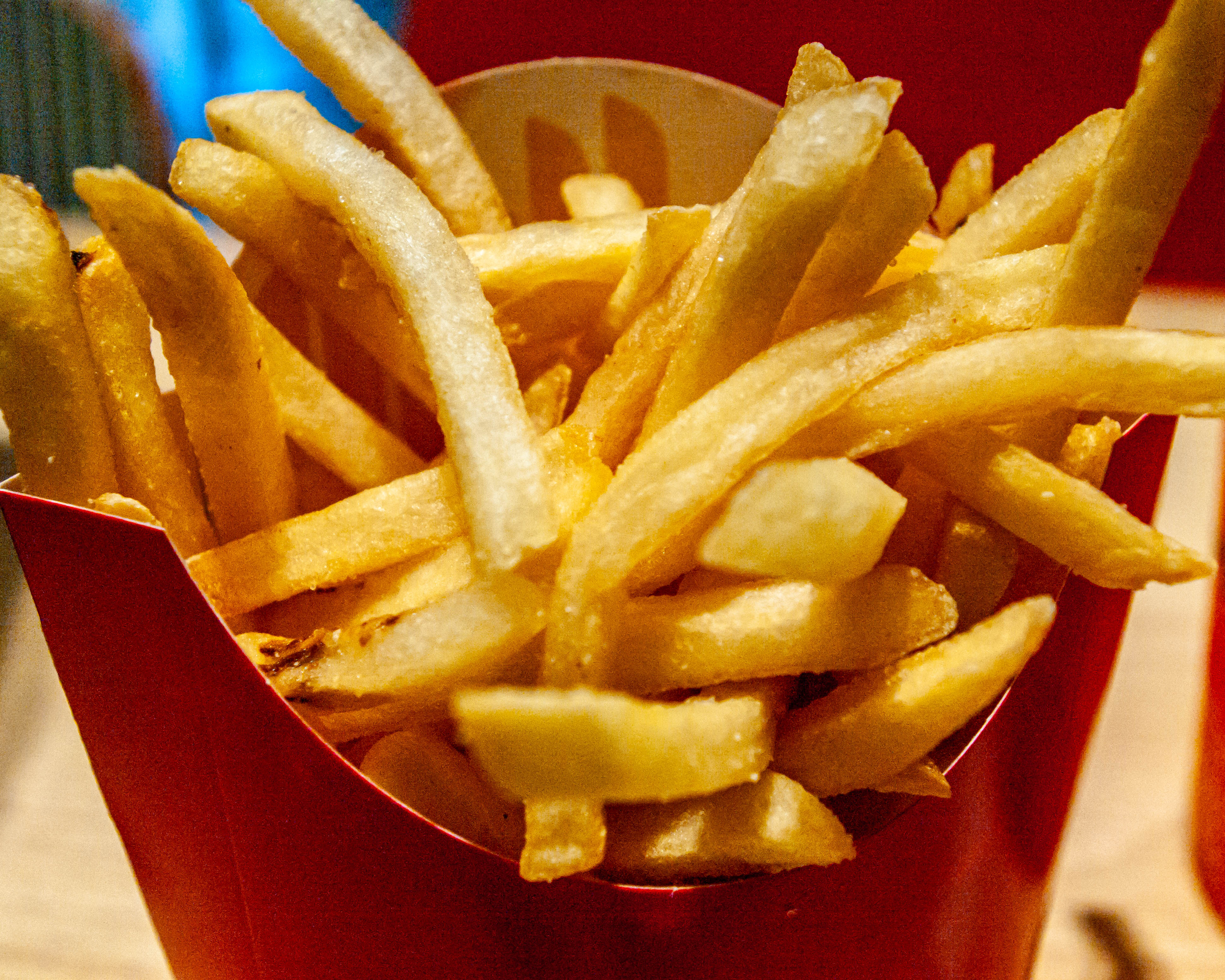
A large portion of McDonald's french fries contain 500 calories, and more than 38% of a person's recommended daily fat intake

Junk food is a term used to describe food that is high in calories from macronutrients such as sugar and fat, and often also high in sodium, making it hyperpalatable, and almost always low in dietary fiber, protein, or micronutrients such as vitamins and minerals. It is also known as high in fat, salt, and sugar food (HFSS food). The term junk food is a pejorative dating back to the 1950s.

Precise definitions vary by purpose and over time. Some high-protein foods, like meat prepared with saturated fat, may be considered junk food. Fast food and fast-food restaurants are often equated with junk food, although fast foods cannot be categorically described as junk food. Candy, soft drinks, and highly processed foods such as certain breakfast cereals, are generally included in the junk food category; much of it is ultra-processed food.

Concerns about the negative health effects resulting from a junk food-heavy diet, especially obesity, have resulted in public health awareness campaigns, and restrictions on advertising and sale in several countries. Current studies indicate that a diet high in junk food can increase the risk of depression, digestive issues, heart disease and stroke, type 2 diabetes, cancer, and early death. Studies tied directly to ultra-processed food are showing these risks as well, alongside an increase in poorer mental health outcomes. These risk factors affect not only adults, but also children and adolescents.

== Etymology ==
The term junk food dates back at least to the early 1950s, although its coinage has been credited to Michael F. Jacobson of the Center for Science in the Public Interest, in 1972. In 1952, the phrase appeared in a headline in the Lima, Ohio, News, "'Junk Foods' Cause Serious Malnutrition", over a reprint of a 1948 article from the Ogden, Utah, Standard-Examiner, originally titled, "Dr. Brady's Health Column: More Junk Than Food". In the article, Dr. Brady writes, "What Mrs. H calls 'junk' I call cheat food. That is anything made principally of (1) white flour and or (2) refined white sugar or syrup. For example, white bread, crackers, cake, candy, ice cream soda, chocolate malted, sundaes, sweetened carbonated beverages." The term cheat food can be traced back in newspaper mentions to at least 1916.

== Definitions ==
In Andrew F. Smith's Encyclopedia of Junk Food and Fast Food, junk food is defined as "those commercial products, including candy, bakery goods, ice cream, salty snacks and soft drinks, which have little or no nutritional value but do have plenty of calories, salt, and fats. While not all fast foods are junk foods, many of them are. Fast foods are ready-to-eat foods served promptly after ordering. Some fast foods are high in calories and low in nutritional value, while other fast foods, such as salads, may be low in calories and high in nutritional value."

Junk food provides empty calories, supplying little or none of the protein, vitamins, or minerals required for a nutritious diet. Some foods, such as hamburgers, and tacos, can be considered either healthy or junk food, depending on their ingredients and preparation methods. The more highly processed items usually fall under the junk food category, including breakfast cereals that are mostly sugar or high fructose corn syrup and white flour or milled corn.

Junk food can be defined through nutrient profiling. The United Kingdom's Advertising Standards Authority, the self-regulatory agency for the UK ad industry, takes this approach. Foods are scored for "A" nutrients (energy, saturated fat, total sugar, and sodium) and "C" nutrients (fruit, vegetable, and nut content, fiber, and protein). The difference between A and C scores determines whether a food or beverage is categorized as HFSS (high in fat, salt and sugar; a term synonymous with junk food). Defining junk food as highly processed or ultra-processed food mainly considers the level of processing rather than nutrient profiles.

In Panic Nation: Unpicking the Myths We're Told About Food and Health, the junk food label is described as nutritionally meaningless: food is food, and if there is zero nutritional value, then it is not a food. Co-editor Vincent Marks explains, "To label a food as 'junk' is just another way of saying, 'I disapprove of it.' There are bad diets – that is, bad mixtures and quantities of food – but there are no 'bad foods' except those that have become bad through contamination or deterioration."

== History ==
In 2010 the New York Times described the history of junk food as "a largely American tale: It has been around for hundreds of years, in many parts of the world, but no one has done a better job inventing so many varieties of it, branding it, mass-producing it, making people rich off it and, of course, eating it." Cracker Jack, the candy-coated popcorn-and-peanuts confection, is credited as the first popular name-brand junk food; it was created in Chicago, registered in 1896, and became the best-selling candy in the world 20 years later.

== Popularity and appeal ==
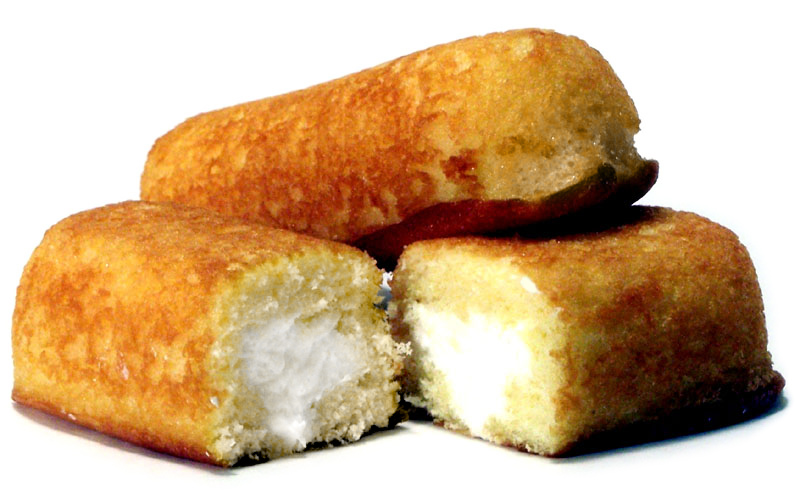
In 2012, Time magazine ranked Twinkies as America's most iconic junk food

Junk food in its various forms is an integral part of modern popular culture. In the US, annual fast food sales are in the area of $160 billion, compared to supermarket sales of $620 billion (a figure which also includes junk food in the form of convenience foods, snack foods, and candy). In 1976, "Junk Food Junkie", a US top 10 pop song, described a junk food addict who pretends to follow a healthy diet by day, while at night gorging on Hostess Twinkies and Fritos corn chips, McDonald's and KFC. Thirty-six years later, Time placed the Twinkie at #1 in an article titled, "Top 10 Iconic Junk Foods": "Not only...a mainstay on our supermarket shelves and in our bellies, they've been a staple in our popular culture and, above all, in our hearts. Often criticized for its lack of any nutritional value whatsoever, the Twinkie has managed to persevere as a cultural and gastronomical icon."

America also celebrates an annual National Junk Food Day on July 21. Its origins are unclear; it is one of around 175 US food and drink days, most created by "people who want to sell more food", at times aided by elected officials at the request of a trade association or commodity group.

As for the source of junk food's appeal, there is no definitive scientific answer; both physiological and psychological factors are cited. Food manufacturers spend billions of dollars on research and development to create flavor profiles that trigger the human affinity for sugar, salt, and fat. Consumption results in pleasurable, likely addictive, effects on the brain. Research by Cassandra Lowe suggests that temporary drops in brain activity, often caused by everyday activities like stress or sleep deprivation, can weaken self-control and increase junk food consumption. At the same time, massive marketing efforts are deployed, creating powerful brand loyalties that studies have shown can trump taste.

It is well-established that the poor eat more junk food overall than the more affluent, but the reasons for this are unclear. Few studies have focused on variations in food perception according to socio-economic status (SES); some studies that have differentiated based on SES suggest that the economically challenged do not perceive healthy food much differently than any other population segment. Recent research into scarcity, combining behavioral science and economics, suggests that, faced with extreme economic uncertainty, where even the next meal may not be a sure thing, judgment is impaired and the drive is to the instant gratification of junk food, rather than to make the necessary investment in the longer-term benefits of a healthier diet.

== Health effects ==
When junk food is consumed very often, the excess fat, simple carbohydrates, and processed sugar found in junk food contribute to an increased risk of obesity, cardiovascular disease, and many other chronic health conditions. A case study on the consumption of fast foods in Ghana suggested a direct correlation between consumption of junk food and obesity rates. The report asserts that obesity resulted in related complex health concerns such as an upsurge in the rate of heart attacks. Studies reveal that as early as the age of 30, arteries could begin clogging and lay the groundwork for future heart attacks. Consumers also tend to eat too much in one sitting, and those who have satisfied their appetite with junk food are less likely to eat healthy foods like fruit or vegetables.

Testing on rats has indicated negative effects of junk food that may manifest likewise in people. A Scripps Research Institute study in 2008 suggested that junk food consumption alters brain activity in a manner similar to addictive drugs like cocaine and heroin. After many weeks with unlimited access to junk food, the pleasure centers of rat brains became desensitized, requiring more food for pleasure; after the junk food was taken away and replaced with a healthy diet, the rats starved for two weeks instead of eating nutritious fare. A 2007 study in the British Journal of Nutrition found that female rats who eat junk food during pregnancy increased the likelihood of unhealthy eating habits in their offspring.

Other research has been done on the impact of sugary foods on human emotional health and has suggested that consuming junk food can negatively impact energy levels and emotional well-being.

In a study published in the European Journal of Clinical Nutrition, the frequency of consumption of 57 foods/drinks of 4,000 children at the age of four and a half were collected by maternal report. At age seven, the 4,000 children were given the Strengths and Difficulties Questionnaire (SDQ), with five scales: hyperactivity, conduct problems, peer problems, emotional symptoms, and pro-social behavior. A one standard deviation increase in junk food was then linked to excessive hyperactivity in 33% of the subjects, leading to the conclusion that children consuming excess junk food at the age of seven are more likely to be in the top third of the hyperactivity scale. There was no significant correlation between junk food and the other scales.

== Anti-junk food measures ==
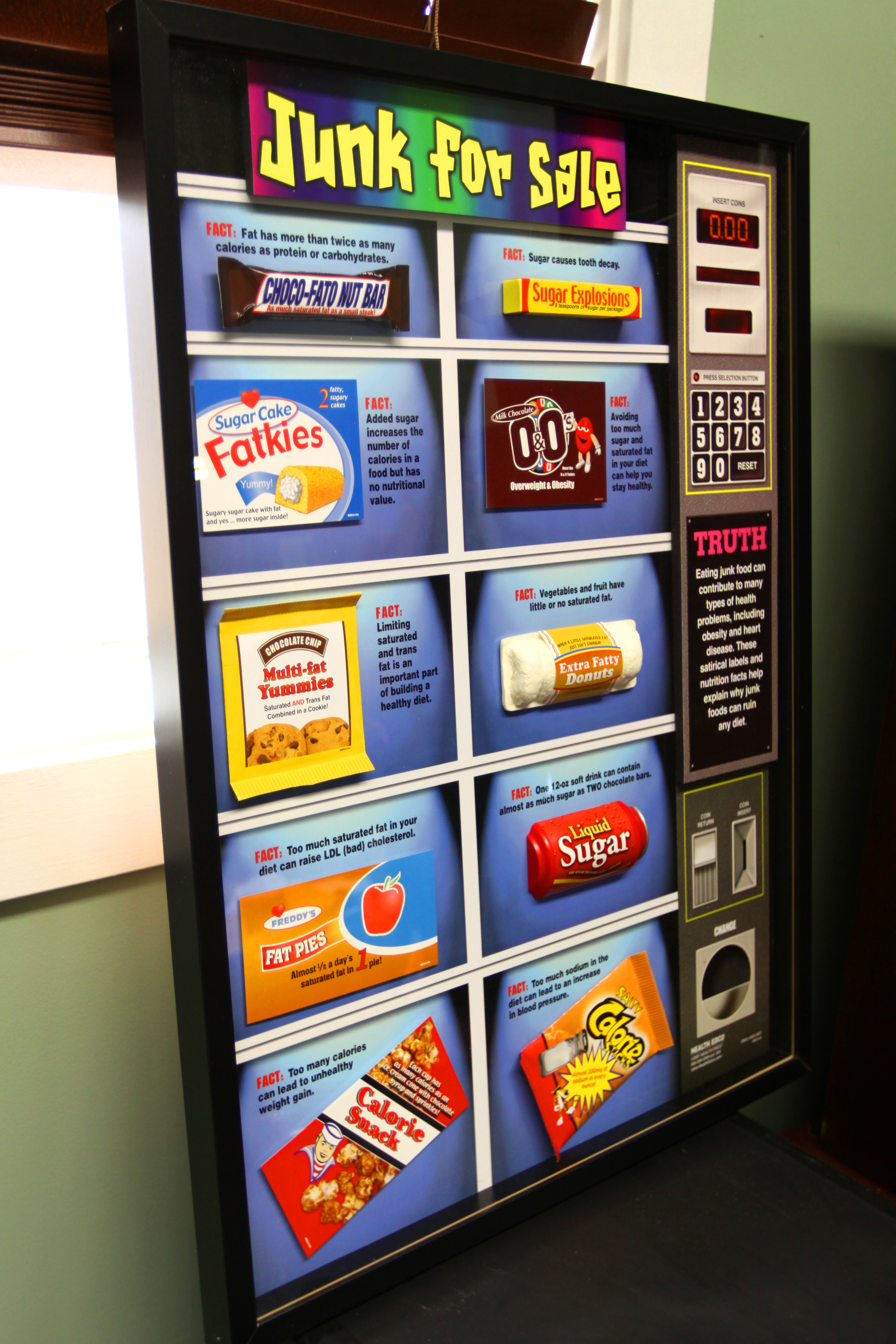
A poster at Camp Pendleton's 21-Area Health Promotion Center describes the effects of junk food that many Marines and sailors consume.

Several countries have taken, or are considering, various forms of legislative action to curb junk food consumption. Eating habits can be influenced by the food environment around us. In 2014, United Nations Special Rapporteur on the right to health, Anand Grover, released his report, "Unhealthy foods, non-communicable diseases and the right to health", and called for governments to "take measures, such as developing food and nutrition guidelines for healthy diets, regulating marketing and advertising of junk food, adopting consumer-friendly labeling of food products, and establishing accountability mechanisms for violations of the right to health."

An early, high-profile, and controversial attempt to identify and curb junk food in the American diet was undertaken by the McGovern Committee (United States Senate Select Committee on Nutrition and Human Needs, chaired by Senator George McGovern) between 1968 and 1977. Initially formed to investigate malnutrition and hunger in the US, the committee's scope progressively expanded to include environmental conditions that affected eating habits, such as urban decay, then focused on the diet and nutritional habits of the American public. The committee took issue with the use of salt, sugar, and fat in processed foods, noted problems with overeating and the high percentage of ads for junk food on TV, and stated that bad eating habits could be as deadly as smoking. The findings were heavily criticized and rebutted from many directions, including the food industry, the American Medical Association, and the committee itself. In 1977, the committee issued public guidelines under the title, Dietary Goals for the United States, which became the predecessor to Dietary Guidelines for Americans, published every five years beginning in 1980 by the US Department of Health and Human Services.

=== Comprehensive measures ===
In 2016, Chile became the first country to implement comprehensive nutritional quality measures aimed at consumers, with the Law of Food Labeling and Advertising. The statute mandated front-of-package warning labels, restricted marketing to children, and banned in-school sales of food and drink containing excessive sugar, salt, or saturated fat.

=== Taxation ===
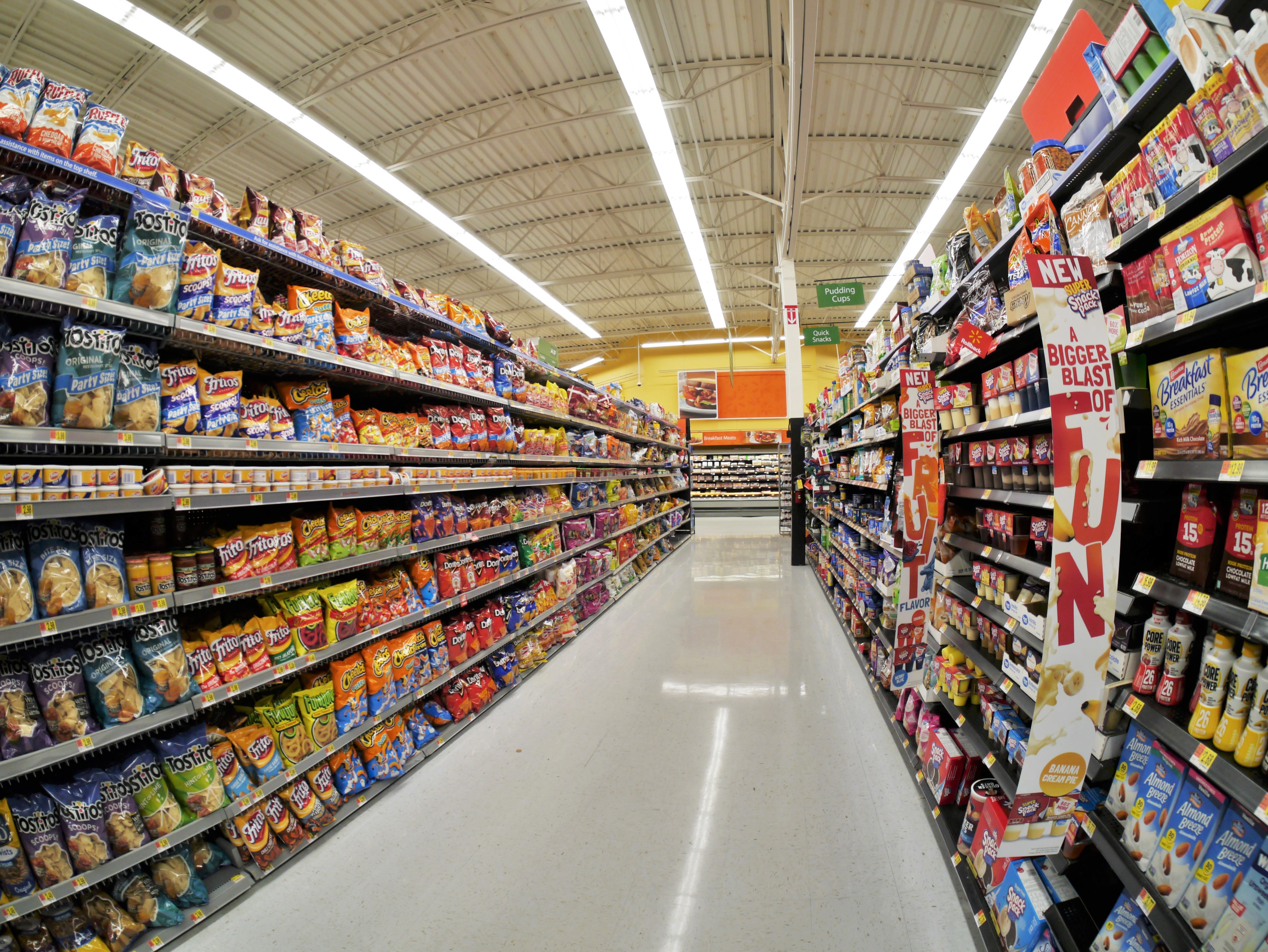
Some governments have considered taxes and limits on advertising or displaying junk food for sale.

To reduce junk food consumption through price control, sin taxes have been implemented. Targeting saturated fat consumption, Denmark introduced the world's first fat-food tax in October 2011 by imposing a surcharge on all foods, including those made from natural ingredients, that contain more than 2.3 percent saturated fat, an unpopular measure that lasted a little over a year. Hungary has imposed taxes on foods and beverages high in added sugar, fat, and salt. Norway taxes refined sugar, and Mexico has various excises on unhealthy food. On April 1, 2015, the first fat tax in the US, the Navajo Nation's Healthy Diné Nation Act of 2014, mandating a 2% junk food tax, came into effect, covering the 27,000 sq mi (70,000 km^{2}) Navajo reservation; the Act targeted problems with obesity and diabetes among the Navajo population.

=== Banning junk food advertisements ===
In mid-2021, the government of the United Kingdom proposed policies that would call for a ban on online advertisements of foods high in fat, salt, and sugar, in addition to an additional ban on advertising such foods on television before 9:00 pm local time. The bans would not affect advertisements that do not directly promote a junk food product, and promoting these products on company webpages and social media accounts would remain permitted. The bans were intended to come into force in 2023, but they became effective from 5 January 2026.

In October 2021, the Ministry of Consumer Affairs of Spain, under the leadership of minister Alberto Garzón, announced a ban on the advertising of several categories of junk food to children under 16. Such advertising would be forbidden on television, radio, online, in movie theaters, and in newspapers. Affected foods include candy, energy bars, cookies, cake, juice, energy drinks, and ice cream. The ban took effect in 2022.

=== Restricting advertising to children ===
Junk food that is targeted at children is a contentious issue. In "The Impact of Advertising on Childhood obesity", the American Psychological Association reports: "Research has found strong associations between increases in advertising for non-nutritious foods and rates of childhood obesity." Advertising of unhealthy foods to children increases their consumption of the product and positive attitudes (liking or wanting to buy) about the advertised product. Children's critical reasoning (the ability to understand what an advertisement is and the aim of advertising to buy the product) is not protective against the impact of advertising, and does not appear to be fully developed during adolescence.

The World Health Organization recommends that governments take action to limit children's exposure to food marketing, stating, "Many advertisements promote foods high in fats, sugar, and salt, consumption of which should be limited as part of a healthy diet. ... Food advertising and other forms of marketing have been shown to influence children's food preferences, purchasing behaviour and overall dietary behaviour. Marketing has also been associated with an increased risk of overweight and obesity in children. The habits children develop early in life may encourage them to adopt unhealthy dietary practices which persist into adulthood, increasing the likelihood of overweight, obesity and associated health problems such as diabetes and cardiovascular diseases."

In the United Kingdom, efforts to increasingly limit or eliminate advertising of foods high in sugar, salt, or fat at any time children may be viewing are ongoing. The UK government has been criticized for failing to do enough to stop advertising and promotion of junk food aimed at children. A UK parliamentary select committee recommended that cartoon characters advertising unhealthy food to children should be banned, supermarkets should have to remove unhealthy sweets and snacks from ends of aisles and checkout areas, local authorities should be able to limit the number of fast food outlets in their area, brands associated with unhealthy foods should be banned from sponsoring sports clubs, youth leagues and tournaments, and social media like Facebook should cut down junk food advertising to children – all are currently just recommendations.

In Australia, a Wollongong University study in 2015 found that junk food sponsors were mentioned over 1,000 times in a single Australian cricket match broadcast, which included ads and branding worn on players' uniforms and on the scoreboard and pitch. A coalition of Australian obesity, cancer, and diabetes organizations called on Cricket Australia, the sport's governing body, to "phase out sponsorships with unhealthy brands", emphasizing that cricket is a "healthy, family-oriented sport" with children in the audience.

=== Restricting sales to minors ===
Several states in Mexico banned sales of junk food to minors, starting in August 2020.

== See also ==
- Obesity
- Ultra-processed food
- Hyperpalatable food
- Bliss point
- Comfort food
- Nutrient profiling
