= Caroline Richmond =

British medical journalist

Caroline Richmond (1941-2023) was a British medical journalist and writer.

== Early life and education ==
Richmond was born in London to Cedric Ivor Smith, an Anglo-Indian civil servant, and Kathleen (née Meeson), a secretary.

Richmond struggled academically and was expelled from Richmond County School for Girls due to disciplinary issues. At age 16, Richmond began working as a laboratory assistant while studying for A-levels at night school. She pursued a degree in zoology at Sir John Cass College in London (now part of London Metropolitan University), which was interrupted by a nervous breakdown. Despite these challenges, she completed her zoology degree at Portsmouth Technical College and earned a master's degree in animal physiology from Birkbeck College, London. She began a PhD in neuroscience at University College London but did not complete it due to discrepancies in experimental results with a colleague.

== Career ==
Richmond began her career by freelancing for the New Scientist and later worked for a start-up publishing company in Lancaster.

In the late 1980s, Richmond became the UK correspondent for the Canadian Medical Association Journal and contributed to television programs and books. She also created a satirical leaflet in 1988 under the pseudonym DRAB — The Dye-Related Allergies Bureau, a subsidiary of the Food Additives Research Team (FART).

Richmond was involved in the ethical debates surrounding medical consent to treatment. In 1992, she underwent surgery to remove the lining of her womb, but the surgeon, Ian Ferguson, removed her ovaries and womb without her consent. She complained to the General Medical Council, and although the surgeon was cleared of misconduct, the case led to changes in guidelines for informed patient consent.

Richmond was one of the founders of the charity HealthSense.

Richmond co-authored the book Insulin Murders (2007) with Vincent Marks, a professor of biochemistry at Surrey University.

In November 2022, Richmond was made an honorary member of the Medical Journalists' Association for her work with HealthSense. Despite suffering from normal pressure hydrocephalus, she continued to lobby on various health issues. She successfully persuaded the Royal Horticultural Society to rename a rose in her garden from "Mortimer Sackler" to "Mary Delany."

== Bibliography ==
- Insulin Murders (2007)
