= Githa Hariharan =

Indian writer based in New Delhi (born 1954)

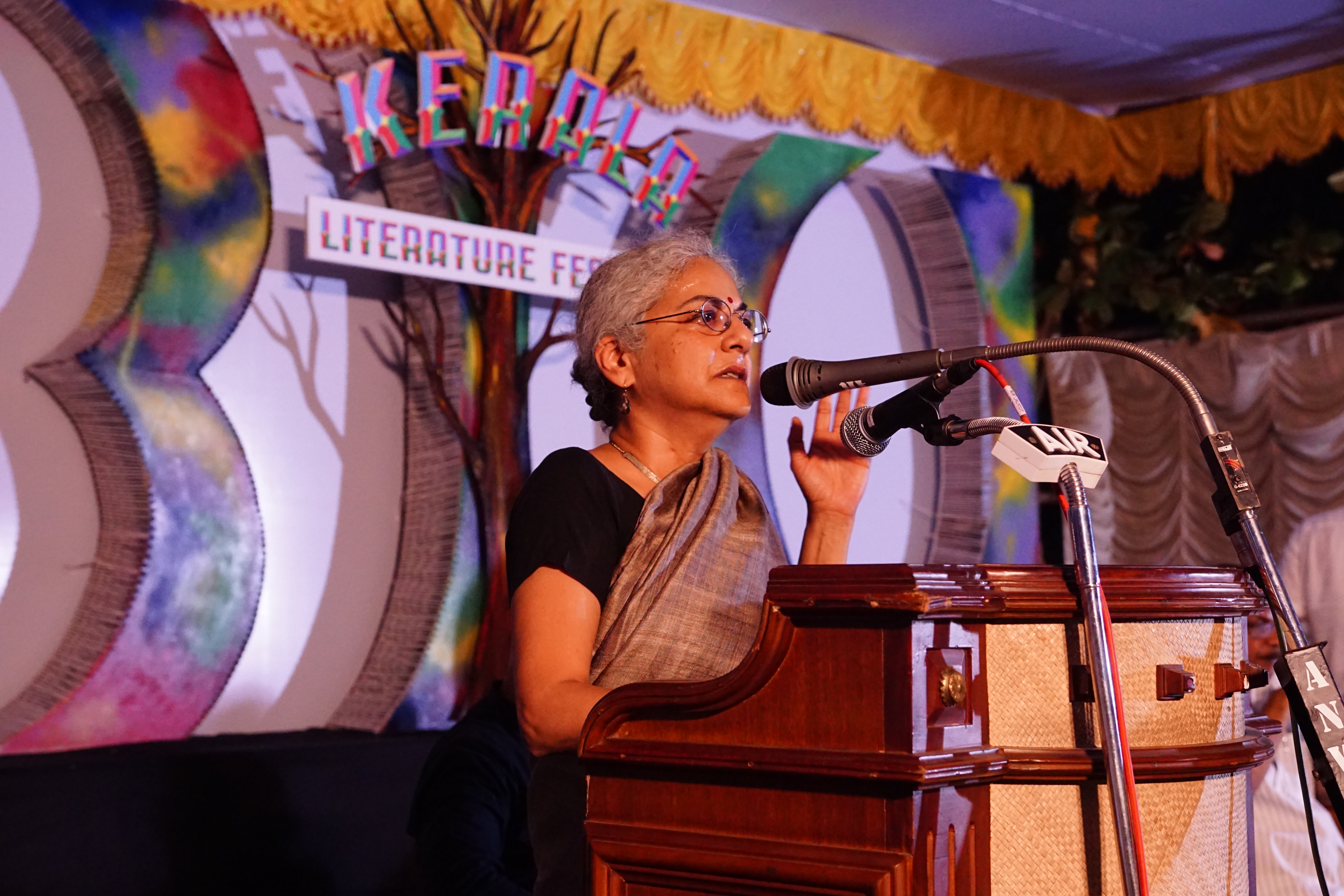
- Born: 1954 (age 71–72); Coimbatore, Madras State (now Tamil Nadu), India
- Occupations: Writer, editor
- Known for: The Thousand Faces of Night; I Have Become the Tide
- Spouse: Dr. Mohan Ram (Divorced)
- Website: githahariharan.com

Githa Hariharan (born 1954) is an Indian writer and editor based in New Delhi. Her first novel, The Thousand Faces of Night, won the Commonwealth Writers' Prize for the best first novel in 1993. Her other works include the short story collection The Art of Dying (1993), the novels The Ghosts of Vasu Master (1994), When Dreams Travel (1999), In Times of Siege (2003), Fugitive Histories (2009) and I Have Become the Tide (2019), and a collection of essays entitled Almost Home: Cities and Other Places (2014).

Githa Hariharan has also written children's stories and co-edited a collection for children called Sorry, Best Friend! (1997). She has also edited a collection of translated short fiction, A Southern Harvest (1993), the essay collection From India to Palestine: Essays in Solidarity (2014) and co-edited Battling for India: A Citizen’s Reader (2019).

== Biography ==
Githa Hariharan was born in 1954 in Coimbatore, Madras State (now Tamil Nadu), India. She was raised in a Tamil Brahmin home in Bombay and Manila with two siblings. Her father was a journalist for the Times of India and a founder and publisher of The Economic Times. During her childhood, she was encouraged to read, and she studied Carnatic music.

She completed a B.A. in English Literature from Bombay University in 1974 and an M.A. in Communications from Fairfield University, Connecticut in 1977.

From 1979 to 1984, Hariharan worked as an editor in the Mumbai, Chennai and New Delhi offices of Orient Longman. From 1985 to 2005, she worked as a freelance editor. She has been a Visiting Professor or Writer-in-Residence at Dartmouth College, George Washington University, the University of Kent, Nanyang Technological University, Jamia Millia Islamia and Goa University.

Githa Hariharan is also a founder member of the Indian Writers' Forum.

== Writing career ==
According to The Atlantic Companion to Literature, "Githa Hariharan's works belong to the renaissance of Indo-English literature which began in the early 1980s when Salman Rushdie's novel Midnight's Children appeared." Hariharan published her first novel, The Thousand Faces of Night, in 1992, which she wrote while on maternity leave from work. According to Meenakshi Bharat, this book "questions the confining code of patriarchy and brings to light the survival strategies of three generations of women" and Hariharan "makes concerted use of myth and folktale to enlarge the space of the lives of "real" people, especially women." She then published a collection of short stories, The Art of Dying, in 1993.

In The Ghost of Vasu Master (1994), a retired schoolteacher, Vasu Master, uses storytelling to support a student who "either cannot or will not speak." After forming the Movement for Secularism with other women writers, she wrote children's stories, and co-edited the collection Sorry, Best Friend (1997) with Shama Futehally. In her novel When Dreams Travel (1999), Hariharan retells Arabian Nights with Scheherazade and her sister Dunyazad as protagonists. According to Hariharan, her interest as a writer was "not in the story of how the 1001 nights began or happened, but where that tale ends. What happens in stories after the moment when people live happily ever after."

Githa Hariharan has described In Times of Siege (2003) as her "first overtly political novel." According to The Atlantic Companion to Literature, it "is in fact a radical book which discusses the ruling political parties' attempt to rewrite history [...] to give the educational system a Hindu slant." In a 2019 interview with The Indian Express, she stated, "My other books, too, looked at the power structure but I finally decided that I had the confidence and the rage to write about where I was living." In The Hindu, Gowri Ramnarayan writes that In Times of Siege, her "angst is over the betrayal of the secularist vision which shaped the nation, the shrinkage of space in contemporary India for debate, dissent, for the co-existence of pluralities, minorities, cultures."

In 2014, her edited volume of nonfiction essays From India to Palestine: Essays in Solidarity was published and includes essays by herself, Meena Alexander, Aijaz Ahmad, Ritu Menon and Nayantara Sehgal. Her 2016 collection Almost Home is described by Kirkus Reviews as "essays on identity, place, and the pervasiveness of the past in the present, by a global literary citizen" and "an uneven collection—never just travel writing or political analysis—that nonetheless seems to map new territory of its own." In a review for The Hindu, Latha Anantharaman writes "the essay on Algeria stands out [...] Hariharan discusses the psychology of colonialism, what happens to the identity of a people when you occupy their land and force them to speak French, think in French, and dress like the French, what happens when you indoctrinate them in French principles and philosophy and yet deny that they are French" and further states "It is in her essay on Palestine that Hariharan best evokes the living voices of people under occupation."

Her sixth novel I Have Become the Tide was published in 2019 and is the third with a focus on contemporary India. In 2020, a Malayalam translation of the novel was published by Mātr̥bhūmi Buks.

Githa Hariharan co-edited the 2019 essay collection Battling for India: A Citizen’s Reader with Salim Yusufji. In a review for The Wire, Priyanka Tripathi writes, "Drawing its vision from Ambedkar's democracy, the book reiterates that an Indian citizen’s political democracy (full rights to the nation) becomes null and void in the absence of social (discrimination on the basis of caste and age) and economic (freeing all Indians from poverty) democracy."

Her work has been translated into Dutch, French, German, Greek, Italian, Spanish, Malayalam, Urdu and Vietnamese. Her writing has also been included in many anthologies of fiction and essays. She has regularly written a monthly column on culture in The Telegraph.

== Activism ==
In 1995, with assistance from Indira Jaising and the Lawyers Collective, Hariharan challenged the Hindu Minority and Guardianship Act, which placed the mother of a child as the natural guardian "after" the father, as a violation of the right to equality guaranteed under Articles 14 and 15 of the Indian Constitution. The case, Hariharan v. Reserve Bank of India was filed with her husband also as a petitioner and led to a Supreme Court of India judgment protecting the rights of children and finding both the mother and father can be natural guardians of the child. The Supreme Court stated, "[the father] cannot be ascribed to have a preferential right over the mother in the matter of guardianship".

== Bibliography ==
=== Author ===
- The Thousand Faces of Night, Penguin Books, 1992; Women's Press, 1996, ISBN 978-0-7043-4465-5
- The Art of Dying, Penguin Books, 1993, ISBN 978-0-14-023339-1
- The Ghosts of Vasu Master, Viking, Penguin Books India, 1994; Penguin Group, 1998, ISBN 978-0-14-024724-4
- When Dreams Travel, Picador, 1999, ISBN 978-0-330-37236-7; Penguin Group Australia, 2008, ISBN 978-0-14-320428-2
- The Winning Team, Illustrator Taposhi Ghoshal, Rupa & Co., 2004, ISBN 978-81-291-0570-7
- In Times of Siege, Pantheon Books, 2003, ISBN 978-0-375-42239-3 ISBN 978-1-4000-3337-9
- Fugitive Histories, Penguin Group, 2009, ISBN 978-0-670-08217-9
- Almost Home, Restless Books, 2014, ISBN 978-1-632-06061-7
- I Have Become the Tide, Simon and Schuster India, 2019, ISBN 9-386-79738-0
- Vēliyēt̲t̲amāyi ñān : nōval, Mātr̥bhūmi Buks, 2020 ISBN 9789389869521 (translated by Johny M. L. into Malayalam)

=== Editor ===
- A Southern Harvest, Kath, 1993, ISBN 978-81-85586-10-6
- Sorry, Best Friend!, Illustrated Ranjan De, Tulika Publishers, 1997, ISBN 978-81-86895-00-9
- Battling for India: A Citizen's Reader, Speaking co-editor Salim Yusufji, 2019, Speaking Tiger, ISBN 9789388874182
