= Healthwatch =

Healthwatch may refer to

- Public health surveillance
- HealthSense, UK charity
- Healthwatch England, Statutory body
