= Bad food =

Bad food may refer to:

- Food poisoning, food that is contaminated and causes sickness when eaten
- Junk food, food that is not very nutritious and causes dietary health problems
