= Usha Pravin Gandhi College of Arts, Science and Commerce =

College in Vile Parle, Mumbai, India

- Type: Graduation, Post Graduation,
- Established: 1990
- Affiliations: University of Mumbai
- President: Amrish Patel
- Principal: Anju Kapoor
- Students: 1086+
- Location: Mumbai, Maharashtra, India
- Language: English
- Website: upgcm.ac.in/

Usha Pravin Gandhi College of Arts, Science and Commerce, also known as UPG College, is a college in Vile Parle, Mumbai, India that is affiliated with the University of Mumbai. It is a branch of the SVKM Group Shri Vile Parle Kelavani Mandal.

== History ==
UPG College was established by Shri Vile Parle Kelavani Mandal in 2003. Since its inception in 2003, Usha Pravin Gandhi College has introduced many courses. The college has introduced courses such as Bachelors in Management Studies (BMS), Bachelors in Mass Media (BMM), Bachelors in Information Technology (BSc.IT), Bachelor of Arts (Film, Television and New Media Production) and Masters in Information Technology (MSc.IT).

UPG College offers add-on courses including:

- Certified digital media marketing
- Certified digital photography
- Integrated course in film making
- Integrated course in television

== Facilities ==
The college is situated on the 3rd floor in between Mithibai College and Narsee Monjee College of Commerce and Economics. The college library and staff room are on the 2 and 1/2 floor. The college office is on the 3rd floor. BSc IT and MSc IT lectures are conducted on the 3rd floor. The college has 2 computer labs, 1 electronic lab and 3 classrooms on the 3rd floor. BMM lectures are conducted on the fourth floor, where the college has 6 classrooms. The BMS department conducts its lectures on the 5th floor, in another 6 classrooms available.

== Faculties ==
=== BMS Department ===
- Prof Shubhangi Nargund
- Dr. Mayur Vyas (Coordinator)
- Prof Sriram Deshpande
- Prof Abhijeet Mohite
- Prof Lokesh Tardalkar
- Dr. Sharyn Bangera
- Dr. Naresh Sukhani

=== BMM Department ===
- Prof Rashmi Gahwlot (Coordinator)
- Dr Navita Kulkarni
- Prof Madhuvanti Date
- Prof Ashish Mehta
- Prof Mayur Sarfare

=== BSc IT Department ===
- Prof Swapnali Lotlikar (Coordinator for BSc IT)
- Prof Smruti Nanavaty (Coordinator for MSc IT)
- Prof Prashant Chaudhary
- Prof Sunita Gupta

=== BA FTNMP Department ===
- Prof Ashish Mehta (Coordinator BA)
- Prof Lokesh Tardalkar
- Prof Dr. Machunwangliu Kamei
- Prof Sukriti Kohli
- Prof Devanshu Singh

== See also ==
- Narsee Monjee College of Commerce and Economics
- Mithibai College
