= John Garrow =

British nutritionist (1929–2016)

- Born: 19 April 1929; Dundee
- Died: 22 June 2016 (aged 87); South Cave
- Education: University of St Andrews
- Known for: European Journal of Clinical Nutrition
- Scientific career
- Fields: Nutrition
- Workplaces: St Bartholomew's Hospital; Northwick Park Hospital

John Stuart Garrow (19 April 1929 – 22 June 2016) was a British nutritionist. He was the editor of the European Journal of Clinical Nutrition from 1988 to 1999.

== Career ==
Garrow was born in Dundee. He was formerly Professor of Human Nutrition, University of London, Honorary consultant physician St Bartholomew's Hospital, St Mark's Hospital, Royal London Hospital and Northwick Park Hospital.

He was the head of Nutrition Research Unit at the MRC Clinical Research Centre, Harrow, and member of Department of Health Committee on Medical Aspects of Food Policy (COMA); Chair of the Joint Advisory Committee on Nutrition Education and the Chair of Association for the Study of Obesity.

He was the chairman of HealthWatch (formerly the Campaign against Health Fraud) from 1991–1993, 1997–1999, 2003–2005.

Garrow was a critic of television personality Gillian McKeith over her pseudoscientific approach to human nutrition. He wrote over 200 peer-reviewed papers on human nutrition.

He died on 22 June 2016 at the age of 87.

== Selected publications ==
- Energy Balance and Obesity in Man (1978)
- Treat Obesity Seriously: A Clinical Manual (1981)
- Obesity and Related Diseases (1988)
- Human Nutrition and Dietetics (1993)
