= Sydney Waterlow =

Sydney Waterlow may refer to:

- Sir Sydney Waterlow, 1st Baronet (1822–1906), English philanthropist and politician
- Sydney Waterlow (diplomat) (1878–1944), British diplomat, Ambassador to Greece, 1933–1939
