= I Have Become the Tide =

2019 novel by Githa Hariharan

- Cover art for I Have Become the Tide
- Author: Githa Hariharan
- Language: English
- Published: 2019 (Simon & Schuster India)
- Publication place: India
- Media type: Print
- Pages: 322 (1st edition)
- ISBN: 9789386797384

I Have Become the Tide is a novel by Githa Hariharan published in 2019 by Simon & Schuster India. It is her sixth novel, and the third to focus on contemporary India. The book was first published in English, and a Malayalam translation was published in 2020 by Mathrubhumi Books.

== Background ==
Githa Hariharan is an Indian writer and editor who has written short stories, novels, and nonfiction essays, and edited collections of fiction and nonfiction essays. I Have Become the Tide is the sixth novel written by Hariharan, and the third to focus on contemporary India. The title of the novel is from the translated title of the poem "I Have Become the Tide" by JV Pawar, and a translated excerpt appears in the epigraph of the book:

I’m the sea; I soar, I surge.
I move out to build your tombs.
The winds, storms, sky, earth.
Now all are mine.
In every inch of the rising struggle
I stand erect.

In the acknowledgments section, Hariharan writes the novel was "born out of the conviction that no writer can engage with life in India today without taking a stand, in some modest way, on the terrible inequalities that continue to ravage the lives of so many of our fellow citizens."

In a 2019 interview with Firstpost, Hariharan said her novel "was written with Rohith Vemula, and all the Rohiths of India, in the same room. In fact, the novel was written with all the Kalburgis of India in the room as well." In a 2019 interview with SheThePeople, she described the book as "not just a novel. It's my citizen's statement at this point in our collective lives."

== Overview ==
The novel is written with three narratives, described by Rogini Mohite in The Hong Kong Review as each "incorporat[ing] histories of Dalit resistance to the caste system which has historically subjugated and segregated them to the social and economic margins, labelling them 'Untouchables', over thousands of years." One narrative focuses on a poetry professor with a theory about the origins of the poet-saint Kannadeva. Another narrative follows three Dalit students as they pursue higher education. There is also a narrative set in the past of South India about the son of a cattle skinner.

== Reception ==
In a review for The Hindu Business Line, Sharanya Manivannan writes that the novel "is required reading for the contemporary Indian context, a highly recommended novel sowed with verse, which provides an unflinching reminder of the eventualities of hatred." In a review for the Deccan Herald, Soni Wadhwa writes that Hariharan "destabilises the notion that poetry and devotion are a domain of the powerful" and "lets these tropes make space for a different discourse about the oppressed in saying that the oppressed need not always be associated with passivity."

In The Hong Kong Book Review, Ragini Mohite writes, "atrocities against the Dalit community persist in alarming numbers in twenty-first century India" and "it is essential for these subaltern Dalit narratives to be at the forefront of critical discourse and literary production." According to Saudamini Jain in a review for the Hindustan Times, the book is "a well-meaning novel – even if its three inter-linked narratives are essentially oversimplified knock-offs of the stories of Rohith Vemula, MM Kalburgi and a 12th century Bhakti movement." In a review for The Hindu, Latha Anantharaman writes, "The experiences of the three students in I Have Become the Tide will ring true for anyone who has faced discrimination in an educational institution."

In a review for Scroll.in, Harsh Mander writes that "The book fittingly ends with a contemporary Dalit rising, patterned after the Bhim Army." In a review for The Indian Express, Ram Sarangan writes, "While Hariharan’s book is about a call to action, at a certain level, it is also encouraging. [...] While seemingly fragile, the voices of defiance and anger do not exist in isolation — they become part of a rising tide."

== Publication history ==
- 2019, India, Simon & Schuster India, ISBN 9789386797384, Print
- 2019, India, Simon & Schuster India, ISBN 9789386797391, EBook
- 2020, India, Simon & Schuster India, ISBN 9789386797872, Print
- 2020, India, Mathrubhumi Books, ISBN 9789389869521, Print (translated by Johny M. L. into Malayalam)
