= Panic Nation =

2006 book by Stanley Feldman and Vincent Marks

- Author: Stanley Feldman, Vincent Marks
- Publisher: John Blake
- Publication date: 2006
- ISBN: 9781844542710

Panic Nation: Unpicking the Myths We're Told About Food and Health, also published as Panic Nation: Exposing the Myths We're Told About Food and Health, is a nonfiction book by Stanley Feldman and Vincent Marks. It was published by John Blake in 2005.

== Overview ==
The book focuses on debunking many popular misconceptions about food and health that are common in the world today, in line with the introduction to the book that quotes Frederick II of the Holy Roman Empire who wrote in the thirteenth century: 'One ought not to believe anything, save that which can be proven by nature and the force of reason.'

== Synopsis ==
The book comprises a series of essays written by individuals working in related fields. These writers address the state of knowledge in the specific fields and how this conflicts with common knowledge. The contributors are Stanley Feldman, Vincent Marks, Michael Fizpatrick, Maurice Hanssen, John Henry, Mick Hume, Lakshman Karalliedde, Malcolm Kendrick, Peter Lachmann, James Le Fanu, Sandy Macnair, Sam Shuster, and Dick Taverne.

== Reception ==
Michael Gard, in a paper in the book Biopolitics and the 'obesity epidemic': governing bodies, commented that the "consistent line of the 30 chapters is that pressure groups and bad scientists have managed to grossly exaggerate the health risks of things like salt, sugar, cholesterol, fast food and passive smoking." Writing in the New Statesman, William Sidelsky said, "The basic problem, according to the authors, is that our society is in thrall to the 'precautionary principle'. Ours is a worst-case-scenario mentality whereby any small or medium-sized risk is converted into a portent of near-certain catastrophe." He added, "It is hard not to concede that they have a point. The tone of the book may be trenchant, but the arguments are sensible and even-handed."

== See also ==
- Junk food
- Fast food
- Criticism of fast food
- Diet and obesity
- Precautionary principle
