= Tallow =

Rendered form of beef or mutton fat

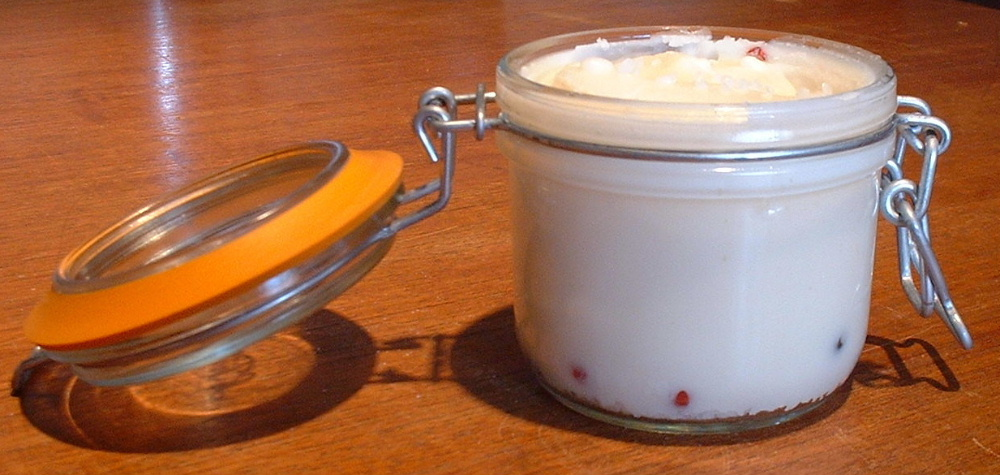
Tallow made by rendering calf suet

Tallow is a rendered form of beef, pork, or mutton suet, primarily made up of triglycerides.

In industry, tallow is not strictly defined as beef or mutton suet. In this context, tallow is animal fat that conforms to certain technical criteria, including its melting point.

Tallow consists mainly of triglycerides (fat), whose major constituents are derived from stearic and oleic acids.

The solid material remaining after rendering is called cracklings, greaves, or graves. It has been used mostly for animal food, such as dog food.

In the soap industry and among soap-making hobbyists, the name tallowate is used informally to refer to soaps made from tallow. This name comes from the chemical suffix "-ate" which signifies a negatively charged ion. Sodium tallowate, for example, is obtained by reacting tallow with sodium hydroxide (lye, caustic soda) or sodium carbonate (washing soda). It consists chiefly of a variable mixture of sodium salts of fatty acids, such as oleic and palmitic.

Dripping is the British term for beef fat that has been rendered; it can be used to make Cornish Pasties.

== Composition ==
Beef tallow
Nutritional value per 100 g (3.5 oz)
- Energy: 902 kcal (3,770 kJ)
- Carbohydrates: 0 g
- Fat: 100 g
- Saturated: 50 g
- Monounsaturated: 42 g
- Polyunsaturated: 4 g
- Protein: 0 g
- Other constituents: Quantity
- Water: 0 g
- Cholesterol: 109 mg
- Link to USDA FoodData Central entry
- ^{†}Percentages estimated using US recommendations for adults.

Beef tallow is 100% fat, 50% of which is saturated fat, 42% as monounsaturated fat, and 4% as polyunsaturated fat (table). It contains no water, protein or carbohydrates. In a reference amount of 100 g (3.5 oz), it supplies 902 calories of food energy and 109 mg of cholesterol (table).

Palmitic acid and stearic acid are the main saturated fatty acids, while oleic acid is the principal monounsaturated fatty acid; it has a low content of polyunsaturated fatty acids (4% of total; details below and in table source).

The fatty acid components of beef tallow are:

- Saturated fatty acids:
  - Palmitic acid (C16:0): 25%
  - Stearic acid (C18:0): 19%
  - Myristic acid (C14:0): 4%
  - Lauric acid (C12:0): 1%
- Monounsaturated fatty acids:
  - Oleic acid (C18-1, ω-9): 36%
  - Palmitoleic acid (C16:1): 4%
  - Eicosenoic acid (C20:1): 1%
- Polyunsaturated fatty acids:
  - Linoleic acid: 3%
  - Linolenic acid: 1%

== Uses ==
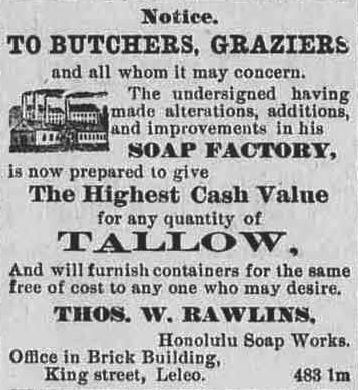
An 1883 ad soliciting tallow from butchers and graziers for soap production in the Hawaii newspaper The Daily Bulletin

Tallow is used mainly in producing soap and animal feed.

=== Food ===
A significant use of tallow is for the production of shortening. It is also one of the main ingredients of the Native American food pemmican. With a smoke point of 480 °F (249 °C), tallow is traditionally used in deep frying and was preferred for this use until the rise in popularity of plant oils for frying. Before switching to vegetable oil with beef flavoring in 1990, McDonald's cooked its French fries in a mixture of 93% beef tallow and 7% cottonseed oil. According to a 1985 article in The New York Times, tallow was also used for frying at Burger King, Wendy's, Hardee's, Arby's, Dairy Queen, Popeyes, and Bob's Big Boy.

In the 2020s, influencers and Robert F. Kennedy Jr.—leader of the Make America Healthy Again (MAHA) movement—began to make unscientific claims about the negative health effects of seed oils and presumed health benefits of tallow over these oils. Kennedy has called upon Americans to "Make Frying Oil Tallow Again".

==== Greaves ====
Greaves (also graves) are similar to cracklings but not identical. They are the fibrous matter remaining from rendering of fat tissue, without the skin. They are used in some dishes, and they are also pressed into cakes and used for animal feed, especially for dogs and pigs, or as fish bait. In the past, the practice has been both favoured and shunned in dog food.

=== Fuel ===
==== Biodiesel ====
Tallow can be used for the production of biodiesel in much the same way as oils from plants are currently used.

==== Aviation fuel ====
The United States Air Force has experimented successfully with the use of beef tallow in aviation biofuels. During five days of flight testing from August 23 to 27, 2010, at Edwards Air Force Base, California, a U.S. Air Force C-17 Globemaster III flew using JP-8 conventional jet fuel in three of its engines and a 50/50 blend of JP-8 and HRJ biofuel made from beef tallow in one engine on August 23, followed by a flight with the same 50/50 blend in all four engines on August 24. On August 27, it flew using a blend of 50% JP-8, 25% HRJ, and 25% coal-based fuel made through the Fischer–Tropsch process, becoming the first United States Department of Defense aircraft to fly on such a blend and the first aircraft to operate from Edwards using a fuel derived from beef tallow.

=== Printing ===
Tallow also has a use in printmaking, where it is combined with bitumen and applied to metal print plates to resist acid etching.

The use of trace amounts of tallow as an additive to the substrate used in polymer banknotes came to light in November 2016. Notes issued in 24 countries, including Canada, Australia, and the United Kingdom, were found to be affected, leading to objections from vegans and members of some religious communities.

=== Candles ===
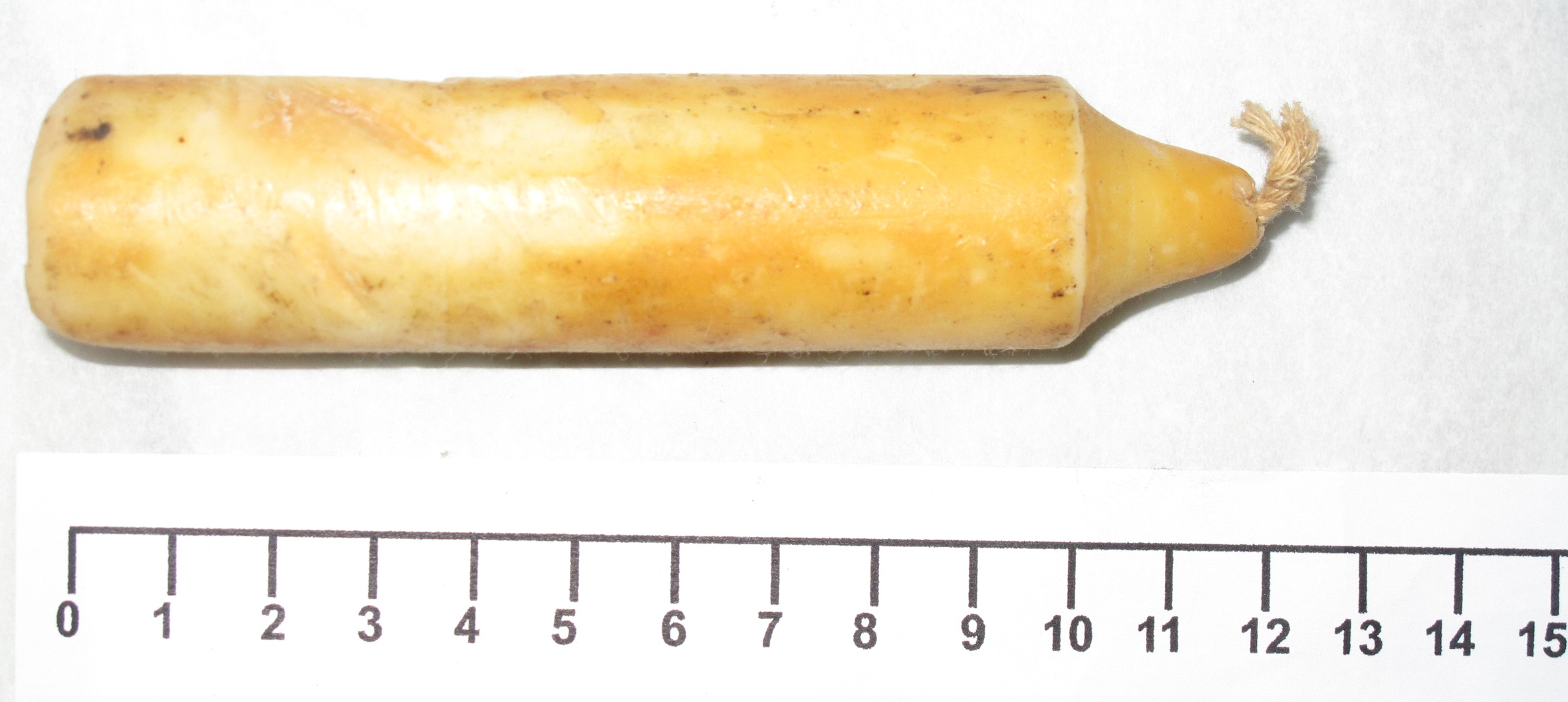
A tallow candle

Tallow was once widely used to make molded candles before more convenient wax varieties became available and, for some time, they continued to be a cheaper alternative. For those too poor even to avail themselves of homemade, molded tallow candles, the "tallow dip," a reed that had been dipped in melted tallow or sometimes a strip of burning cloth in a saucer/cresset of tallow grease, was an accessible substitute. Such a candle was often simply called a "dip" or, because of its low cost, a "farthing dip" or "penny dip".

=== Lubrication ===
Early in the development of steam-driven piston engines, the hot vapors and liquids washed away most lubricants very quickly. It was soon found that tallow was quite resistant to this washing. Tallow and compounds including tallow were widely used to lubricate locomotive and steamship engines at least until the 1950s. (During World War II, the vast fleets of steam-powered ships exhausted the supply, leading to the large-scale planting of rapeseed because rapeseed oil also resisted the washing effect.) Tallow is still used in the steel rolling industry to provide the required lubrication as the sheet steel is compressed through the steel rollers.

Another industrial use is as a lubricant for certain types of light engineering work, such as cutting threads on electrical conduit. Specialist cutting compounds are available, but tallow is a traditional lubricant that is easily available for cheap and infrequent use.

The use of tallow or lard to lubricate rifles was the spark that started the Indian Mutiny of 1857. To load the new Pattern 1853 Enfield Rifle, the sepoys had to bite the cartridge open. It was believed that the paper cartridges that were standard issue with the rifle were greased with lard (pork fat), which was regarded as unclean by Muslims, or tallow (cow fat), which is incompatible with Hindu dietary laws. Tallow, along with beeswax, was also used in the lubricant for American Civil War ammunition used in the Springfield rifled musket. A combination of mutton tallow, paraffin wax, and beeswax is still used as a patch or projectile lubricant in present-day black powder arms.

Tallow is used to make a biodegradable motor oil.

Tallow is also used in traditional bell foundry, as a separation for the false bell when casting.

=== Industrial ===
Tallow can be used as flux for soldering lead.

=== Textiles ===
Mutton tallow is widely used as a starch, lubricant, and softener in textile manufacturing. Pretreatment processes in textiles include a process called sizing. In sizing, a chemical is necessary to provide the required strength to yarns mounted on the loom. Mutton tallow provides required strength and lubrication to the yarns.

== See also ==
- Suet
