= John Waterlow =

British physiologist

- Scientific career
- Fields: physiology

John Conrad Waterlow (13 June 1916 – 19 October 2010) was a British physiologist who specialised in childhood malnutrition. Waterlow was born into a well known London printing family. Whilst growing up, the family home was often visited by the likes of E.M. Forster and Virginia Woolf.

== Education ==
Waterlow was educated at Eton College. Whilst at school, Waterlow was inspired by a lecture about Leprosy in West Africa given by Tubby Clayton. Consequently, he went on to study natural sciences at Trinity College, Cambridge in 1935, before changing to study medicine and physiology instead. He graduated in 1935 with a first class degree in physiology and went on to qualify as a doctor in 1942 having studied at the London Hospital Medical College, during which much time was spent treating casualties of The Blitz.

== Career ==
After qualifying as a doctor, he was attached to the Medical Research Council's (MRC) military personnel research programme, working under B.S. Platt, where he spent a year studying heat stroke and heat exhaustion in Basra. After the Second World War had ended, Platt became the head of a new research unit at the MRC, focusing on nutrition and Waterlow followed him and worked with the unit. During this time, Platt imprinted the prediction on Waterlow that, "Nutrition will be the problem of the future". He was sent to the Caribbean in 1945 to investigate why large numbers of children there were dying and discovered that many had oedematous malnutrition and fatty livers, but was unsure why this was the case. To investigate the cases, he made a microbalance using the newly invented adhesive Araldite, to weigh 2 mg samples of liver tissue and also a microrespirometer to measure the enzyme activity in the samples. The microrespirometer is said to have been much more sensitive than those used by other biochemists at the time and the microbalance was sensitive to within one millionth of a gram. He subsequently discovered that the syndrome he was observing was the same as Kwashiorkor which had been described a few years earlier in Africa. Waterlow set about investigating the biochemical basis of Kwashiorkor, both in the West Indies and at several field stations in Africa. He was the founding editor of the European Journal of Clinical Nutrition. He was elected Fellow of the Royal Society in 1982.

Whilst in the Caribbean he established 'The Tropical Metabolism Research Unit' at the University of the West Indies in Jamaica.

== Written work ==
Waterlow wrote extensively during the course of his career. His most famous works include:

'Protein turnover in mammalian tissues and in the whole body' (1978) - JC Waterlow, P.J Garlick and D.J Millward.

'Protein-energy malnutrition: the nature and extent of the problem' (1992) - JC Waterlow.

== Personal life ==
Waterlow was the son of Sir Sydney Waterlow, a British diplomat and Helen Eckhard who was from a well off family of German immigrants living in Manchester. In 1939 he married Angela Grey who was a history student at Cambridge University and they later went on to have two sons and one daughter; Sarah, Oliver and Dick.
