= Shri Vile Parle Kelavani Mandal =

Public charitable trust in India

Shri Vile Parle Kelavani Mandal (SVKM) is a Public charitable trust in India that runs and operates many educational schools, colleges and institutions across India.

== History ==
SVKM started in 1934 when it took over the Rashtriya Shala, a school established in 1921, in the wake of the Swadeshi Movement and Indian Independence Movement. Over the years, it has made the Mumbai suburb of Vile Parle into an educational hub with over 40 schools and colleges under its wing. It has now spread to other Indian cities like Bangalore, Hyderabad, Chandigarh, Ahmedabad, Indore, Navi Mumbai, among others.

== Institutions ==
Some of the institutions under the SVKM umbrella are mentioned below.

Founded	Name of Institution	Location
1934	Smt. Gokalibai Punamchand Pitambar High School	Vile Parle, Mumbai
1961	Mithibai College of Arts	Vile Parle, Mumbai
1961	Chauhan Institute of Science	Vile Parle, Mumbai
1963	Shri Bhagubhai Mafatlal Polytechnic	Vile Parle, Mumbai
1964	Narsee Monjee College of Commerce and Economics	Vile Parle, Mumbai
1977	Jitendra Chauhan College of Law	Vile Parle, Mumbai
1980	Amrutben Jivanlal College of Commerce and Economics	Vile Parle, Mumbai
1981	SVKM's NMIMS	Vile Parle, Mumbai
1990	Harkisan Mehta Institute of Media, Research and Analysis	Vile Parle, Mumbai
1992	Acharya A. V. Patel Junior College	Vile Parle, Mumbai
1994	Dwarkadas J. Sanghvi College of Engineering	Vile Parle, Mumbai
1997	Chatrabhuj Narsee Memorial School & N. D. Parekh Pre-Primary School	Vile Parle, Mumbai
2003	Usha Pravin Gandhi College of Management	Vile Parle, Mumbai
2004	Pravin Gandhi College of Law	Vile Parle, Mumbai
2004	Dr. Bhanuben Nanavati College of Pharmacy	Vile Parle, Mumbai
2006	SVKM’s Institute of International Studies	Vile Parle, Mumbai
2008	Shri J. V. Parekh International School	Vile Parle, Mumbai
2017	SVKM's Institute of Technology	Dhule
2017	SVKM's Institute of Pharmacy	Dhule

PSA "Education is an area where chances of confusion should be completely avoided as it can result in having a damaging effect on the careers of children” - Delhi High Court While other schools/institutions bear the name "Narsee" they are not a part of Shri Vile Parle Kelavani Mandal The SVKM institutions are 1) Narsee Monjee Institute of Management Studies (N.M.I.M.S.) 2) Narsee Monjee College of Commerce & Economics (N.M.) 3) Chatrabhuj Narsee Memorial School Vile Parle (C.N.M. SCHOOL & N. D. PAREKH PRE-PRIMARY)

parents should be aware as consumers and look up the mandals, trusts and companies that operate the schools they send their children to.

== Cultural festivals ==
SVKM's colleges organise some of Mumbai's most attended inter-college festivals such as Umang of Narsee Monjee College, which has been tagged as Asia's fastest growing festival, and Kshitij of Mithibai College. From 13 to 16 January 2016, SVKM organised a festival called Yuva for the students and teachers of all institutions under its banner, holding competitions in 13 different sporting categories.
