= Sarah Broadie =

British historian of philosophy (1941–2021)

Sarah Jean Broadie OBE FBA FRSE (née Waterlow; 3 November 1941 – 8 August 2021) was a British philosopher, a Professor of Moral Philosophy and Wardlaw Professor at the University of St Andrews. Broadie specialised in ancient philosophy, with a particular emphasis on Aristotle and Plato. Her work engages with metaphysics and both ancient and contemporary ethics. She achieved numerous honours throughout her career as an academic philosopher. Broadie studied Greats at Somerville College, Oxford, graduating in 1960. Previously she worked at the University of Edinburgh, University of Texas at Austin, Yale, Rutgers, and Princeton.

== Awards and honours ==
Broadie's first major honour came in 1990 when she was elected as a Fellow of the American Academy of Arts and Sciences. In 2002, she was elected as a Fellow of the Royal Society of Edinburgh. Broadie was invited to give the Nellie Wallace Lectures at the University of Oxford in 2003. Her series was titled, 'Nature and Divinity in the Philosophies of Plato and Aristotle.' In the same year Broadie was also elected as a Fellow of the British Academy. In 2006 Broadie was elected as member of the Academia Europaea. Members of the Academia are nominated by peers and must be eminent scholars in their fields. In 2012 Broadie became the 105th President of the Aristotelian Society, and delivered the Presidential Address titled 'Actual Instead.'

Broadie was an Honorary Fellow of Somerville College, Oxford. She was appointed Officer of the Order of the British Empire (OBE) in the 2019 Birthday Honours for services to classical philosophy.

== Books ==
=== As Sarah Waterlow ===
- Nature, Change, and Agency in Aristotle's Physics: a philosophical study (Oxford University Press, Oxford, 1984)
- Passage and Possibility: a study of Aristotle's modal concepts (Oxford University Press, Oxford, 1984)

=== As Sarah Broadie ===
- Ethics with Aristotle (Oxford University Press, New York, 1991)
- Aristotle's Nicomachean Ethics: Philosophical Introduction and Commentary, with a new translation by Christopher Rowe (Oxford University Press, Oxford, 2002)
- Aristotle and Beyond: Essays on Metaphysics and Ethics (Cambridge University Press, Cambridge, 2007)
- Nature and Divinity in Plato's Timaeus (Cambridge University Press, Cambridge, 2011)
- Plato's Sun-Like Good (Cambridge University Press, Cambridge, 2021)

== Personal life ==
Sarah Broadie was the daughter of the distinguished physiologist John Waterlow and married the philosopher and author Frederick Broadie in 1984.
