= Shreya Tripathi =

Indian health activist (died 2018)

- Born: 1998 or 1999
- Died: 9 October 2018
- Occupation: Tuberculosis Activist
- Years active: 2016-2018
- Known for: Successful legal battle regarding bedaquiline access to tuberculosis patients

Shreya Tripathi (b.1998/1999 - d. 9 October 2018) was an Indian health activist.

Tripathi was diagnosed with tuberculosis in 2012. She was treated with first- and second-line medications, but her strain was found to be extensively drug-resistant tuberculosis (XDR-TB), rendering the usual treatment ineffective. She was forced to drop out of school in 2015 due to her illness. By age 18, she had lost so much weight that she measured only 55 lb (25 kg). Her family was forced to travel hundreds of miles from their home in Patna to a respiratory disease center in New Delhi in the hopes of getting bedaquiline, a newly developed medication for XDR-TB. She was refused because she was not a resident of New Delhi. The Revised National TB Control Program (RNTCP) in India declined to provide her with bedaquiline. With the assistance of Anand Grover, Tripathi filed suit against the RNTCP to force the organization to provide access to the medication. On 20 January 2017, the High Court in Delhi ruled in favour of Tripathi and ordered that she receive the drug. The court further ordered that bedaquiline be made available at 70 Indian treatment centres; it had previously only been obtainable at six. Although her suit was successful, the treatment delay resulted in irreversible scarring to Tripathi's lungs, resulting in her death at age 19.

Stephen Lewis highlighted Tripathi's story in a 2017 keynote address. In an article written after Tripathi's death, Lewis and Jennifer Furin suggested that Tripathi "belongs with Malala and Greta in the pantheon of teenagers whose unswerving principles have brought the powerful to their knees".

John Green discussed Tripathi's story in his non-fiction book Everything is Tuberculosis and highlighted her experience in his newsletter "We're Here" on 21 March 2025. Tripathi was noted to have been a fan of The Fault In Our Stars, Green's novel centered around terminal cancer patients, of which she was reading at the time of her death.
