= Cassandra J. Lowe =

Canadian public health neuroscientist

Cassandra J. Lowe is a Canadian public health neuroscientist, specializing in understanding why some individuals have a hard time regulating junk food consumption. Lowe uses a multidimensional approach that combines repetitive transcranial magnetic stimulation (rTMS), neuroimaging (EEG, fMRI, MRI) and aerobic exercise to create causal models linking brain health to dietary decisions and behaviours. She was formally a BrainsCAN Postdoctoral Fellow within The Brain and Mind Institute and Department of Psychology at the University of Western Ontario, working with Dr. J. Bruce Morton and Dr. Lindsay Bodell. Since 2022, she has undertaken a position at the University of Exeter, in the United Kingdom as Lecturer in the School of Psychology.

== Education ==
Cassandra J. Lowe received an undergraduate degree (Honours BA) in Psychology from Brock University. After completing her BA, Lowe went on to complete her MSc and PhD in Public Health and Health Systems at the University of Waterloo, supervised by Peter A. Hall.

== Research ==
Lowe's research seeks to understand why some individuals are more vulnerable to excessive food consumption, and how interventions, such as aerobic exercise, can be used to improve dietary choices. Her work has appeared in some of the most eminent scientific journals in public health and psychology, including The Lancet Child & Adolescent Health, Trends in Cognitive Sciences, Psychosomatic medicine, and Neuroscience & Biobehavioral Reviews.

Lowe's research has been integral in highlighting the critical role the prefrontal cortex plays in regulating snack food consumption, and how obesity can impact brain health and cognitive functions. Her graduate was instrumental in establishing the causal relationship between activity in the prefrontal cortex and dietary behaviours in healthy young adults. Using inhibitory repetitive transcranial magnetic stimulation to decrease activity in the left dorsolateral prefrontal cortex, she was the first to demonstrate that individuals consume more snack foods when prefrontal activity is less than optimal, an effect that was mediated by decreased executive functions. Critically, these findings were specific to the consumption of hyperpalatable but nutritionally deprived junk foods (e.g., chocolate, potato chips). While Lowe used experimental methods to decrease brain activity, several everyday occurrences, such as acute stress, and sleep restriction, can temporarily reduce brain activity in the prefrontal cortex. Lowe's work has been instrumental in highlighting how these fluctuations in brain activity can increase the likelihood individuals will overindulge in appealing "junk foods", which over time, can increase for excessive adiposity and obesity. Her postdoctoral research has expanded this work to assess to determine the environmental and social factors that influence brain development and self-regulation during adolescence. Other research interests include determining the shared and separate mechanisms driving overconsumption across clinical, subclinical, and healthy populations to develop a better understanding of why some people are more prone to dysregulated eating behaviours, and why some individuals prone to dysregulated eating behaviours develop clinical eating disorders and others do not.

== Awards ==
Lowe has received several prestigious postdoctoral fellowships from BrainsCAN (Tier 1, 2017; Tier 2, 2019) and the Canadian Institutes of Health Research (2019). In 2014, Lowe won a Brain Star Award from for her work demonstrating that decreased prefrontal activity predisposes healthy young adults to excessive food consumption.
