= John Marks (doctor) =

British doctor (1925–2022)

John Henry Marks
- Born: 30 May 1925; Stamford Hill, London, England
- Died: 20 September 2022 (aged 97); St John's Wood, London, England
- Relatives: Vincent Marks (brother)

John Henry Marks (30 May 1925 – 20 September 2022) was an English medical doctor who was Chairman of the British Medical Association, a position he held from 1984 to 1990.

== Life and career ==
His six-year term is unique – at the time he was leading the Association and the profession in a campaign against Kenneth Clarke's reforms of the NHS based on the untried concept of an internal market. He played a major role in defending the Abortion Act 1967 in the face of attacks by "pro-lifers" including Victoria Gillick and the MPs David Alton and Sir Russell Brain. In 1970 he successfully led the campaign against the BMA Council's decision to recommend an annual registration fee to the GMC without prior reform of its constitution. He also played a major role in campaigns in favour of restricting smacking, the wearing of seat belts, and respecting the confidentiality of sufferers from AIDS.

Marks was born in Stamford Hill in Hackney, London on 30 May 1925. He was educated at Tottenham County School and the University of Edinburgh, qualifying on 5 July 1948, the day that the NHS started. Following hospital posts and service in the RAMC he resided in Elstree, and worked as a General Practitioner in Borehamwood, 1954–90.

Marks was an MD, a Fellow of the Royal College of General Practitioners and a DObst RCOG of the Royal College of Obstetricians and Gynaecologists. His autobiography, The NHS: Beginning, Middle and End? was published in May 2008.

In August 2018, it was noted that Marks, then 93, was one of the few surviving doctors who joined the National Health Service during the era of its creation 70 years prior. He died at Wellington Hospital in St John's Wood, London, on 20 September 2022, aged 97. His brother, Vincent Marks, was a clinical pathologist and biochemist.
