= McDonald's French fries =

McDonald's product

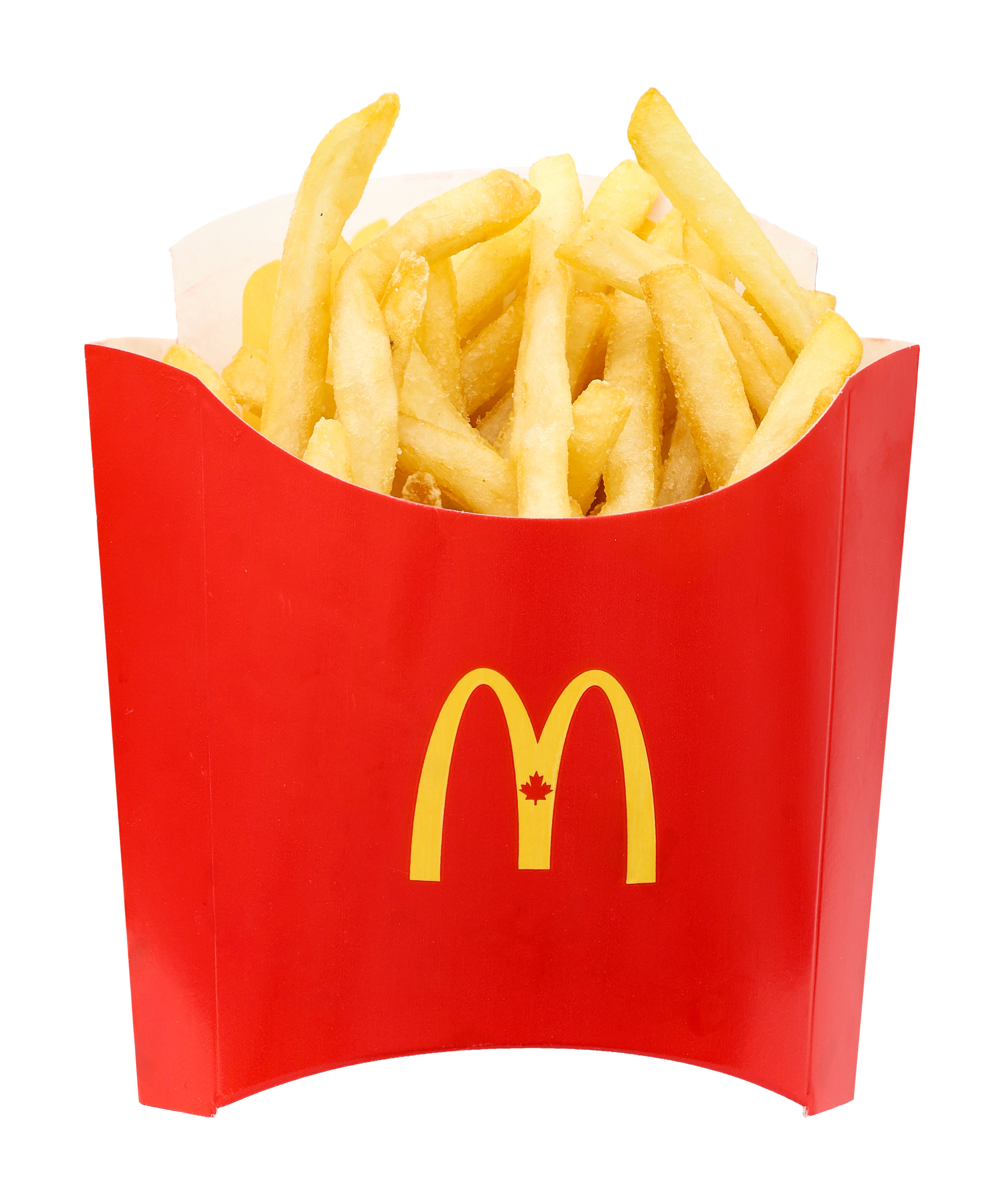
- The French fries in a red French fry box with the Golden Arches used in Canada
- Type: French fries
- Inception: 1949
- Manufacturer: McDonald's
- Available: Available
- Current supplier: Lamb Weston; J.R. Simplot Company; McCain Foods

McDonald's French fries, marketed as World Famous Fries in America, are a French fries product at McDonald's restaurants.

== History ==
Introduced in 1949, the French fries were cooked in a mixture of 93% beef tallow and 7% cottonseed oil.

In the 1950s, CEO and founder Ray Kroc established quality control measures for McDonald's suppliers, ensuring potatoes maintained a solids content within the optimal range of twenty to twenty-three percent. Kroc also pioneered the practice of "curing" the potatoes to convert sugars to starch, thus achieving consistently crisp French fries. This process involved storing potatoes at medium-high temperatures for several weeks. Additionally, he introduced the "potato computer," developed by Louis Martino, to calculate the precise cooking time for fries, based on the fluctuation of oil temperature during frying.

Kroc preferred to use potatoes from Idaho, but these were seasonal. Food scientists Edwin Traisman and Ken Strong developed a process of quick frying sliced potatoes to remove moisture before freezing them, which was patented in 1962. This allowed McDonald's fries to be consistent year-round.

Subsequently, in 1967, Kroc made a handshake agreement with J. R. Simplot to have his Simplot company supply them with frozen fries, replacing fresh-cut potatoes.

In the late 1980s, Phil Sokolof, a millionaire businessman who had suffered a heart attack at the age of 43, took out full-page newspaper ads in New York, Chicago, and other large cities accusing McDonald's menu of being a threat to American health, and asking them to stop using beef tallow to cook their French fries.

After this sustained campaign, including by the National Heart Savers Association against saturated fats and the beef tallow they were using, in 1990, they switched to vegetable oil with beef flavouring. However, vegetable oils at that time were hydrogenated (to make them semi-solid and retard spoilage) which also creates trans-fats, whose metabolic dangers were not then widely known. McDonald's has not disclosed whether its beef flavoring contains meat, but it is known to contain milk byproducts. In 2002, McDonald's paid US$10 million to settle lawsuits that accused the chain of mislabeling its French fries as vegetarian.

The "thin style" French fries have been popularized worldwide in large part by McDonald's and, to a lesser extent, Burger King.

In 2008, McDonald's ceased using trans fats in both US and Canadian markets. In 2013, McDonald's Canada introduced poutine nationwide, after having it in Quebec for 10 years.

As part of McDonald's 2014 U.S. "Our Food. Your Questions." transparency campaign, the company released a behind-the-scenes video (featuring former MythBusters co-host Grant Imahara) explaining how its U.S. fries are made.

== Product ==
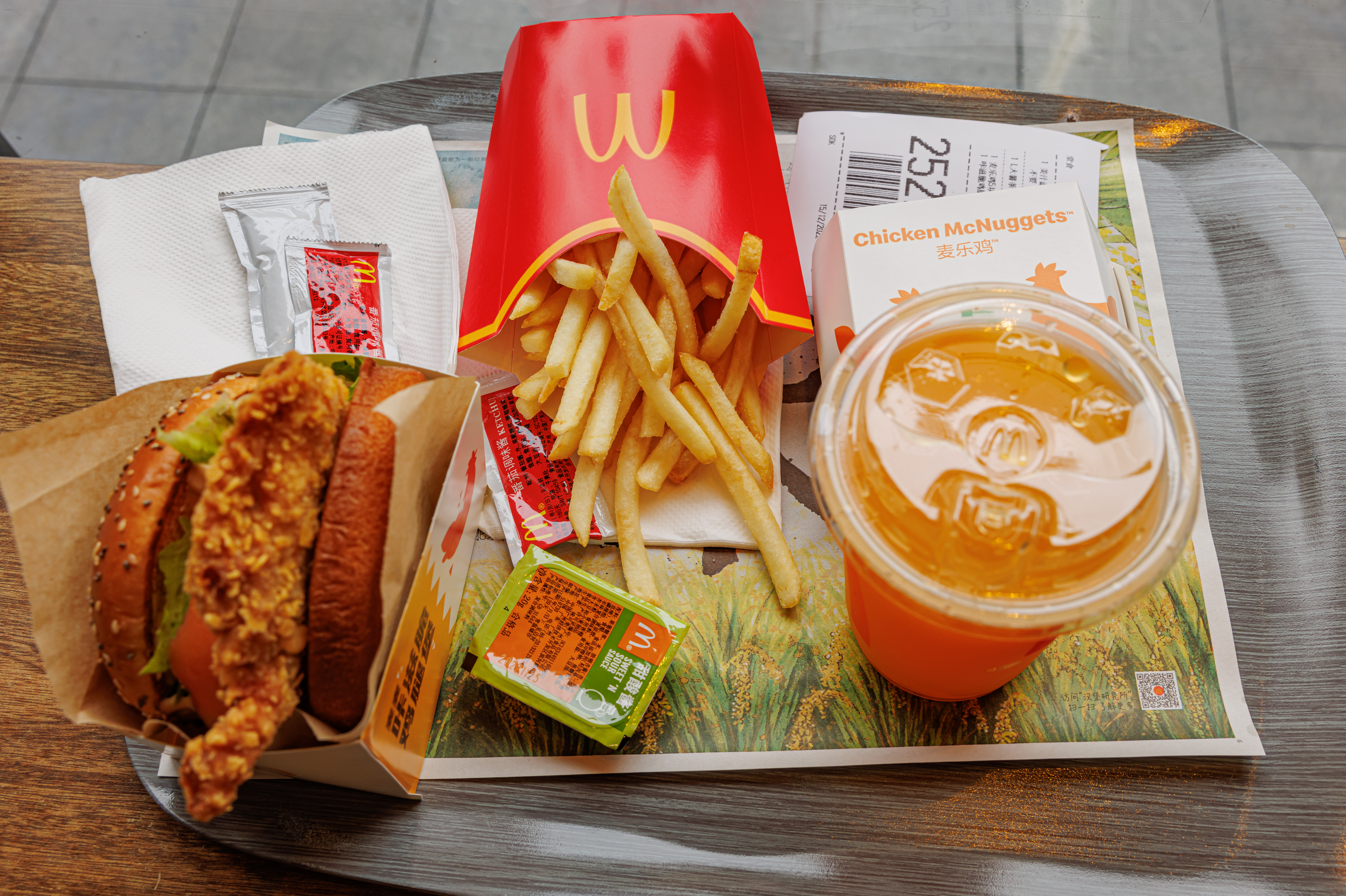
McDonald's French fries alongside a burger and drink

In the United States, McDonald's has stated its French fries are made from potato varieties including russet (such as Russet Burbank, Ranger Russet, and Umatilla Russet) and Shepody potatoes, described as non-GMO. Other reporting has described the fries as being made using 19 ingredients, including dextrose, TBHQ, polydimethylsiloxane, citric acid, and sodium acid pyrophosphate. McDonald's contracts with several different suppliers to produce the fries, including Lamb Weston, J.R. Simplot Company, and McCain Foods.

As of 2019, the French fries sold in Germany use a different recipe, with the ingredients being listed as potatoes, sunflower oil, rapeseed oil, salt, dextrose, disodium phosphate and polydimethylsiloxane.

As for the manufacturing process, the potatoes are first brought to the plant, where they are mechanically cut, blanched, partially fried, flash-frozen, and then shipped to individual restaurants of the franchise.
