= Sharanya Manivannan =

Indian author

Sharanya Manivannan (born 1985) is an Indian author, columnist and poet.

== Early life ==
Manivannan was born in India. She lived in Sri Lanka, Malaysia and from 2007 she is residing in Chennai, India. She received the Lavanya Sankaran Fellowship for 2008–2009. She writes a column, the 'Venus Flytrap' in the New Indian Express.

Her 2018 book The Queen of Jasmine County is a fictionalised account of the 9th century Tamil Hindu poet Andal. She combined prose with poetry in her lyrical novel where she imagines a young Kodhai transforming into poet goddess Andal.

== Selected works ==
Some of her books are:

- Incantations Over Water (graphic novel, 2021)
- Mermaids In The Moonlight (picturebook, 2021)
- The Queen of Jasmine Country (novel, 2018)
- The Altar of the Only World (poetry, 2017)
- The High Priestess Never Marries (short fiction, 2016)
- The Ammuchi Puchi (picturebook, 2016) and
- Witchcraft (poetry, 2008).

== Awards ==
Her book The High Priestess Never Marries received the 2016 South Asia Laadli award.
