= Mithibai College =

Undergraduate college in Mumbai, India

Mithibai College Mumbai
- Established: 1961; 65 years ago
- Affiliations: University of Mumbai; MSBSHSE
- President: Amrish Patel
- Principal: Krutika B. Desai
- Location: Mumbai, Maharashtra, India
- Website: mithibai.ac.in

The Mithibai College of Arts, Chauhan Institute of Science & Amrutben Jivanlal College of Commerce and Economics is a college affiliated to the University of Mumbai offering junior (grades 11—12), certificate, undergraduate and postgraduate courses in the streams of Arts, Science and Commerce. The college was established in 1961 in Vile Parle, Mumbai by Shri Vile Parle Kelavani Mandal. In 2018 it was granted autonomous status by UGC. The Mithibai building also houses sister colleges such as the Jitendra College of Law, NMIMS School of Architecture, International Studies and Design and the Usha Pravin Gandhi College.

== History ==
Mithibai College was established by Shri Vile Parle Kelavani Mandal (SVKM) in 1961, as a part of the trust's silver jubilee celebration. The Mithibai College of Arts and Chauhan Institute of Science, commonly known as the main wing, was started first, and the Amrutben Jivanlal College of Commerce & Economics started 19 years later. Other courses including Bachelor of Management Studies, Bachelor of Science and Master of Science degree courses in biochemistry, biotechnology and computer science were subsequently introduced by the college. The college has grown to a student population of more than 32,000.

Krutika Desai is the Principal of the institute. There is a 50% reservation for Gujarati speaking community and the conventional SC/ST/OBC/females reservation as per the government norms.

== Rankings ==
Mithibai College has consistently ranked among the top five in India Today College rankings for the years 2017, 2018 and 2019.

== Student college life ==
=== Mithibai Kshitij ===
Mithibai Kshitij is the college's annual cultural festival. It is a four-day festival with more than 500 colleges being invited every year. Events include competitions, workshops, seminars, exhibitions, amateur and professional shows which are conducted at various SVKM venues. Mithibai Kshitij is mainly known for its pronights (Pro-Nites), where artists and bands like Shreya Ghoshal, Juggy D, Raghu Dixit, Pentagram, Kailash Kher, Hard Kaur, Akriti Kakkar, Tochi Raina, Jazzy-B, Vishakha and many others have performed, on the Jashoda Rang Mandir Ground's Stage in Mithibai Kshitij.

In 2011, The Dirty Picture movie's crew including Vidya Balan, Bappi Lahiri, Vishal–Shekhar, Sunidhi Chauhan, Emraan Hashmi, Tusshar Kapoor and a few others enlightened the stage.

In 2012, they had Punjabi International Artist Jazzy-B along with Ramji Gulati. On 12 December 2012, they had an Electronic Dance Music night, with a line up; DJ Anish Sood B2B Lost Stories (DJs), opened by DJ SHAAN.

This festival is organized by the students of Mithibai College, the Core Committee, Committee Members and Volunteers (approximately 600 students) are a part of it. The 19 Department's of Mithibai Kshitij are divided into two types; Admin and Events, which mainly consists of Marketing, Public Relations, Computers, Performing Arts, Literary Arts, Film Fest, Pro-Nites, etc.

Mithibai Kshitij has started a trend of international female EDM artists since 2013. DJ Teri Miko (2013), DJ Da Candy (2014), DJ Sheherezade (2015). It has also promoted many Bollywood movies till date; The Dirty Picture, Jackpot (the 2013 film), Krrish 3, Heartless, Badlapur, Baaji, Brothers, Shaandar, Angry Indian Goddesses are some of them.

It was launched by Hrithik Roshan and Priyanka Chopra in 2013 and by Akshay Kumar, Siddharth Malhotra and Jacqueline Fernandez in 2015. Both the launches were in the form of a talk show which was hosted by film critic Rajeev Masand and broadcast by CNN IBN.

The theme of the festival in 2015 was launched by Shahid Kapoor and Alia Bhatt along with the launch of their song "Shaam Shaandar" from the film Shaandaar.

In 2026, the Kshitij festival pro-nites were headlined by Shreya Ghoshal, as well as surprise artists Sachin-Jigar and Mika Singh. The Kshitij talk shows have hosted celebrities like Mithoon, Rani Mukerji, Vicky Kaushal, Manoj Bajpayee and Ayushmann Khurana among others.

== Notable alumni ==
- Namit Shah, Actor
- Neil Bhatt, Actor
- Bosco–Caesar, Choreography duo
- Shreya Bugde, Actress
- Sukriti Kakar, Singer
- Suhasi Dhami, Actress
- Drashti Dhami, Actress
- Digangana Suryavanshi, Actress
- Bobby Deol, Actor
- Esha Deol, Actress
- Ajay Devgn, Actor
- Ashutosh Gowariker, Film Director
- Avadhoot Gupte, music director and Singer
- Boman Irani, Actor
- Gulki Joshi, Actress
- Jyothika, Actress
- Rahul Kamerkar, Lawyer and Author
- Mohsin Khan, Actor
- Ekta Kapoor, Film and Television Producer
- Kajol, Actress
- Kareena Kapoor, Actress
- Shahid Kapoor, Actor
- Rani Mukerji, Actress
- Jubin Nautiyal, Singer
- Vivek Oberoi, Actor
- Parvathy Omanakuttan, Actress, Model, Miss India 2008
- Karan Patel, Actor
- Amrita Prakash, Actor
- Satish Rajwade, Film Director
- Lubna Salim, Actress
- Rakhi Sawant, Actress
- Fatima Sana Shaikh, Actress
- Renuka Shahane, Actress
- Vatsal Sheth, Actor
- Namrata Shirodkar, Actress
- Shreyas Talpade, Actor
- Raveena Tandon, Actress
- Rahul Vaidya, Actor and Singer

== See also ==
- Shri Vile Parle Kelavani Mandal (SVKM)
- Hyderabad (Sind) National Collegiate Board
- University of Mumbai
- HSNC University
- SVKM's NMIMS
