= Sydney Waterlow (diplomat) =

British diplomat (1878–1944)

Sir Sydney Philip Perigal Waterlow KCMG CBE (22 October 1878, New Barnet – 4 December 1944, Oare, Wiltshire) was a British diplomat, serving as British Minister to Thailand, Ethiopia and Bulgaria before he ended as Ambassador to Greece from 1933 to 1939.

== Life ==
Sydney Waterlow was the eldest son of George Sydney Waterlow – the fourth son of Sir Sydney Waterlow, 1st Baronet – and Charlotte Elizabeth Beauchamp. He was educated at Eton and Trinity College, Cambridge, where he gained a first class in the Classics Tripos (B.A. 1900, M.A. 1905).

Waterlow joined the Diplomatic Service in 1900. From 1900 to 1901 he served in the Eastern Department of the Foreign Office. He was an Attaché in Washington in 1901, was appointed Third Secretary in December 1902, and served as such in Washington from 1902 to 1905. Resigning from the Foreign Office, Waterlow become a University extension lecturer until the outbreak of World War I, when he returned to the FO. He rose to be Acting First Secretary in 1919, and participated in the Paris Peace Conference. From 1922 to 1924 he was Director of the Foreign division of the Department of Overseas Trade, and from 1924 to 1926 he was a Counsellor in the Foreign Office. He was Envoy Extraordinary and Minister Plenipotentiary in Bangkok from 1924 to 1926, in Addis from 1928 to 1929, in Sofia from 1929 to 1933, and in Athens from 1933 to 1939.

Waterlow was also an author, editor and translator of several literary and classical works. In 1920 he was appointed as a Commander of the Order of the British Empire and in 1935 appointed as a Knight Commander of the Order of St. Michael and St. George. Waterlow was also appointed to the Legion of Honour. He died 4 December 1944 at Oare near Marlborough.

== Family ==
Waterlow married twice. His first wedding was at St Marylebone Parish Church in London on 19 November 1902 to Alice Isabella Pollock (1876–1953), the only daughter of Sir Frederick Pollock, 3rd Baronet. The marriage was annulled in 1912. In 1911, he proposed unsuccessfully to Virginia Woolf. In 1913 he remarried, to Helen Margery Eckhard, a daughter of Gustav Eckhard of Didsbury. There were three children, including John, the physiologist, from the second marriage.

== Works ==
- Shelley, 1900
- (tr. and ed.) The Medea & Hippolytus of Euripides, 1906
- (ed.) In praise of Cambridge, an anthology in prose and verse, 1912
- (tr. with Desmond MacCarthy) The Death of a Nobody, by Jules Romains, 1913
- (ed. with Cora May Williams) The analysis of sensations, and the relation of the physical to the psychical by Ernst Mach, 1914
- Memories of Henry James, 1926
