= HealthSense =

- Founded: 1991
- Registration no.: 1003392
- President: Nick Ross (2026)
- Revenue: £7,720 (2025)
- Website: www.healthsense-uk.org

HealthSense is a UK charity that promotes evidence-based medicine. Its aims are:

- The assessment and testing of treatments, whether orthodox or alternative
- Consumer protection of all forms of health care, by thorough testing of all products and procedures, and better regulation of all practitioners
- Better understanding by the public and the media that valid clinical trials are the best way of ensuring protection

HealthSense changed its name in 2021 from HealthWatch after the Health and Social Care Act 2012 created the Healthwatch England organisation.

== Description ==
The charity was founded by the oncologist Michael Baum, medical journalists Caroline Richmond and Diana Brahams, clinical pathologist and biochemist Vincent Marks, TV presenter Nick Ross and nutrionist John Garrow. It began as the 'Campaign Against Health Fraud', mostly targeting unfounded claims by proponents of alternative medicine and downright quackery, but soon broadened to audit all forms of medical practice, and many of its members are more concerned about unproven orthodox therapies than complementary ones. It has attracted criticism from some believers in alternative medicine who claim that scientific approaches cannot be applied to their way of working.

In early 2026, HealthSense's President is Nick Ross and its patrons include Lord Dick Taverne, Steve Jones, Margaret McCartney, Sir Michael Rawlins and the comedian Robin Ince.

HealthSense maintains it has no commercial sponsors of any form and relies on membership fees and donations from other charities.

HealthSense has a small international membership. It publishes the quarterly HealthSense Newsletter and occasional "position papers" on controversial medical treatments.

== Awards ==
- The HealthSense Award: Since 1993, HealthSense has given an annual award to people who have made contributions to evidence-based medicine and ethics.
- Student prizes: The organisation has an annual research-oriented competition for students in medical fields. HealthSense awards two first prizes of £500 each and up to five prizes of £100 for runners-up.
