= Vincent Marks =

English clinical pathologist and biochemist (1930–2023)

- Born: 10 June 1930; Harlesden, London, England
- Died: 6 November 2023 (aged 93)
- Known for: Clinical pathology and medico-legal advancements; Insulin radioimmunoassay development in the UK; nutrition studies
- Spouse: Averil Sherrard
- Children: 2
- Scientific career
- Fields: Biochemistry; clinical pathology

Vincent Marks (10 June 1930 – 6 November 2023) was an English pathologist and clinical biochemist known for his works on studying insulin and hypoglycemia. His contributions to medical science include simplifying low blood glucose testing, introducing insulin radioimmunoassay, and advancing diabetes research. Marks played an important role in high-profile medico-legal cases, notably providing expert testimony that helped acquit Danish-born British socialite Claus von Bülow in 1985, a case that was the basis of the Oscar-winning movie Reversal of Fortune (1990).

Marks was also a nutritionist who studied intestinal hormones and coined the term "muesli belt malnutrition", referring to parents feeding their children what is considered extremely healthy foods, but, in the process depriving them of essential fats.

== Early life ==
Vincent Marks was born on 10 June 1930, in Harlesden, North West London, to Lewis and Rose (née Goldbaum) Marks, in a Jewish household. His parents ran a pub. Marks attended Tottenham Grammar School before going to study medicine on a scholarship at Brasenose College, Oxford, in 1948. He completed his training and qualified as a doctor from the St Thomas' Hospital in London, in 1954.

It is noted that his interest in medicine was driven in part by his mother's insistence that their childhood home be neat and tidy for the "doctor's visit", leading him and his brother to think highly of doctors and medicine as a profession. During his time at Oxford, he was branded a communist after demanding that The Daily Worker, a newspaper mouthpiece of Communist Party of Great Britain, be introduced in the university's common rooms. He later joined the party, but left it in 1956 following the suppression of the Hungarian Uprising by the Soviet Union. In the 1980s he was a member of the Social Democratic Party (SDP).

== Career ==
Marks began his career in the late 1950s at the National Hospital for Neurology and Neurosurgery, focusing on detecting low blood sugar and researching pancreatic and glucose-management hormones. Notably, he simplified the testing for low blood glucose using glucose oxidase, a method that foreshadowed modern diabetes diagnostics including colour-changing glucose strips. Collaborating with South African medical researcher Ellis Samols, Marks introduced insulin radioimmunoassay into the UK, transforming insulin level measurement. The method had earlier been developed in the United States.

Marks moved to Surrey in 1962, working as a consultant chemical pathologist in Epsom. He co-authored the textbook Hypoglycaemia in 1965, and later became a professor of biochemistry at the University of Surrey in 1970. Marks established a laboratory for insulin testing and founded a master's course in clinical pathology. His laboratory was among the first to offer insulin assays for testing across National Health Service (NHS) hospitals in the United Kingdom. His research extended to monitoring drug levels in the blood and investigating hormones like melatonin and insulin-like growth factors.

Marks also studied intestinal hormones and helped designate the gastric inhibitory polypeptide (GIP) as an obesity hormone. He also coined the term "muesli belt malnutrition", referring to parents feeding their children what is considered extremely healthy foods, but, in the process depriving them of essential fats. He explored this topic in his book Panic Nation (2006), which he co-authored with Stanley Feldman.

Marks gained prominence in the medico-legal field, providing expert opinions in notable cases. His testimony in Danish-born British socialite Claus von Bülow's 1985 trial challenged accusations of insulin injection and led to an acquittal. The case was made into a book and later into an Oscar winning movie, Reversal of Fortune. In his testimony, Marks said that the insulin-covered needle was most likely planted by someone who did not realize that insulin is cleaned off the needles once it is injected. Marks also testified against Beverley Allitt in 1993, who used insulin to murder four children, and at the trial of Colin Norris in 2008. In 2007, he co-authored Insulin Murders detailing his involvement in high-profile medico-legal cases and reflecting on his career. The book was among the first to talk about insulin as a murder weapon and documented more than 50 years of medical cases in which insulin had been used as a weapon.

Marks retired in 1995 but remained active as an emeritus professor, contributing to research, publishing, and medico-legal work. He served as the president at the Association of Clinical Biochemists between 1989 and 1991, and as the vice president at the Royal College of Pathologists. In a career spanning more than 50 years, he authored over 50 papers, contributed to more than 300 research publications, and authored almost 20 textbooks. His last book, The Forensic Aspects of Hypoglycaemia, was published in 2019.

== Personal life ==
In 1957, Marks married sculptor and artist Averil Sherrard and had two children. Marks was known to have been an atheist and a humanist who was opposed to religion. Along with his wife, he campaigned for various causes including saving a park in Guildford, Surrey, where they lived, from developers. He was a founding member of the charity HealthSense.

His brother John Marks was also a doctor, and the chair of the British Medical Association.

Marks died on 6 November 2023, at the age of 93.

== Selected works ==
- Marks, Vincent; Rose, Frank Clifford (1965). Hypoglycaemia. Blackwell.
- Marks, Vincent; Feldman, Stanley (2006). Panic Nation: Exposing the myths we're told about food and health. Kings Road Publishing. ISBN 978-1-85782-840-5.
- Marks, Vincent; Richmond, Caroline (2007). Insulin Murders. Taylor & Francis. ISBN 978-1-85315-760-8.
- Marks, Vincent; Cantor, Thomas; Mesko, Dusan; Pullmann, Rudolf; Nosalova, Gabriela (2012). Differential Diagnosis by Laboratory Medicine: A Quick Reference for Physicians. Springer Science & Business Media. ISBN 978-3-642-55600-5.
- Hubbard, Ron; Marks, Vincent (2013). Clinical Applications of Monoclonal Antibodies. Springer Science & Business Media. ISBN 978-1-4613-1573-5.
