= Indira Jaising =

Indian lawyer (born 1940)

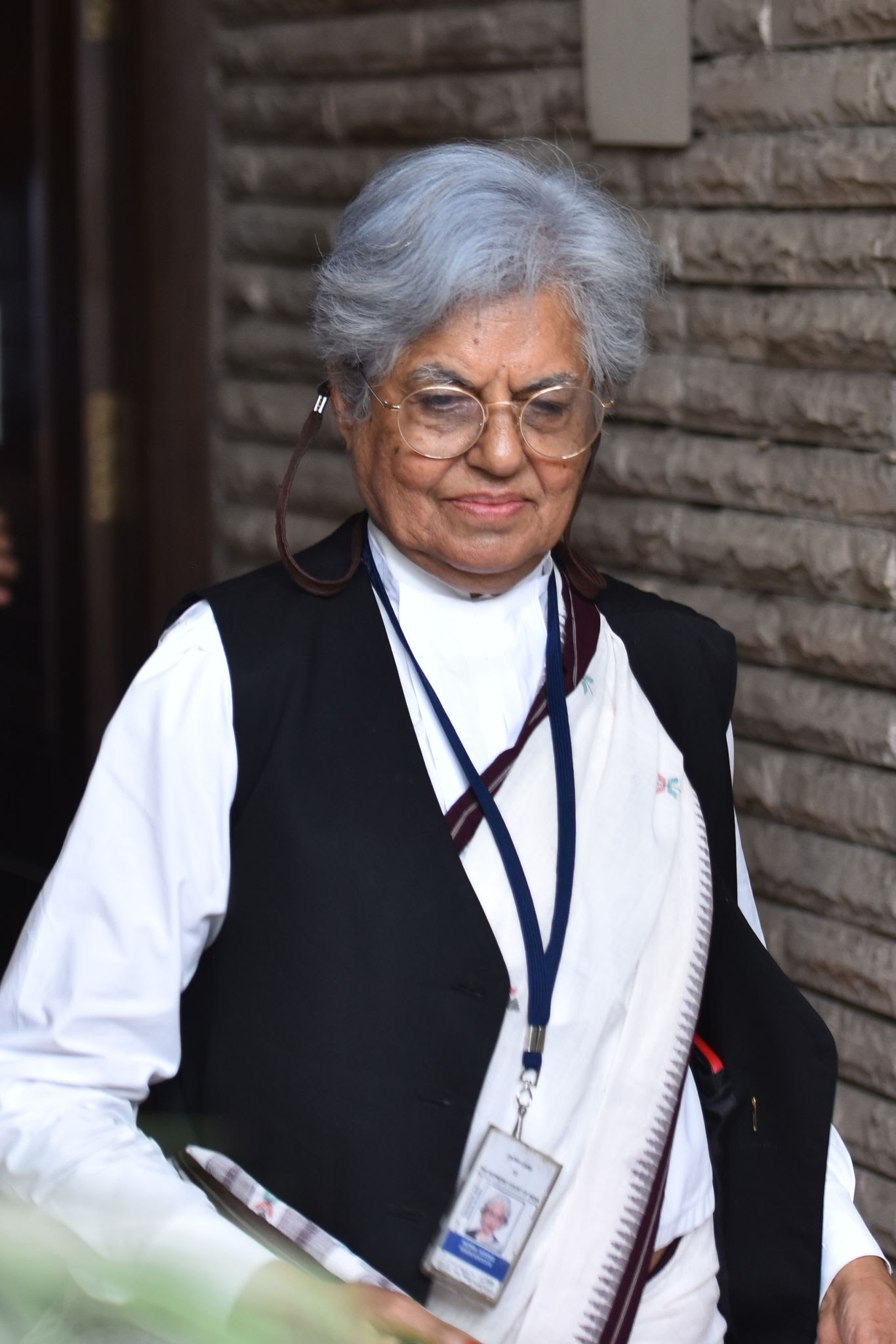
- Born: Indira Jaising; 3 June 1940 (age 86); Bombay Presidency, British India (now Mumbai, Maharashtra, India)
- Occupation: Lawyer
- Known for: Human rights and gender equality activism
- Spouse: Anand Grover

Indira Jaising (born 3 June 1940) is an Indian Senior Advocate. In 2018, she was ranked 20th in the list of 50 Greatest Leaders of the World by Fortune magazine. In 2009, Ms Jaising became the first woman to be appointed as the Additional Solicitor General of India. She was also the first Indian woman elected to the UN Committee on the Elimination of Discrimination against Women (CEDAW) from 2009-2018. She is a co-founder of The Leaflet (a digital platform for critical legal analysis and views) with Anand Grover.

== Early life ==
Jaising was born on 3 June 1940 in Mumbai to a Sindhi Hindu family. She attended St. Teresa's Convent High School, Santacruz, Mumbai, and the Bishop Cotton Girls' School, Bengaluru. She earned a Bachelor of Arts from Bangalore University. In 1962, she earned a Master of Laws from the University of Bombay.

In 1986, she became the first woman to be designated a Senior Advocate by the Bombay High Court. In 2009, Jaising became the first female Additional Solicitor General of India. From the beginning of her legal career, she has focused on the protection of human rights and the rights of women.

== Fighting for women ==
Jaising argued several cases relating to discrimination against women, including Mary Roy's case, which led to the grant of equal inheritance rights for Syrian Christian women in Kerala, and the case of Rupan Deol Bajaj, the IAS officer who had successfully prosecuted KPS Gill for outraging her modesty. This was one of the first cases of sexual harassment that had been successfully prosecuted. Jaising also argued the case of Githa Hariharan, in which the Supreme Court decided that a mother is equally a natural guardian of a child as a father. Jaising also successfully challenged the discriminatory provisions of the Indian Divorce Act in the High Court of Kerala, thus enabling Christian women to get a divorce on the grounds of cruelty or desertion, a right that was denied to them. She has also represented Teesta Setalvad in a case where she was accused of embezzling money.

In 2015, Jaising argued the case for Priya Pillai in the Green Peace India case. In 2016, Indira Jaising challenged the procedure for designating senior advocates in the Supreme Court.

More recently, Indira Jaising wrote a column for The Indian Express, criticizing the manner in which the Indian Supreme Court rejected Nupur Sharma's plea for consolidation of FIRs in criminal cases filed against her for allegedly defaming Prophet Mohammed. In the article, Jaising said the Supreme Court's "remarks against Sharma are uncalled for, and can prejudice low courts."

== Human rights and the environment ==
Jaising has represented the victims of the Bhopal tragedy in the Supreme Court of India in their claim for compensation against the Union Carbide Corporation. Jaising also represented Mumbai residents who were facing eviction. Jaising has been associated with several Peoples Commissions on Violence in Punjab to investigate the extrajudicial killings, disappearances, and mass cremations that took place during the period 1979 to 1990. The United Nations appointed Jaising to a fact-finding mission investigating the alleged murder, rape and torture by security forces against Rohingya Muslims in Myanmar's Rakhine state.

Jaising has represented several environmental cases in the Supreme Court of India.

== Lawyers Collective ==
In 1981, Jaising founded the Lawyers Collective with her husband Anand Grover. The organization is devoted to feminist and left-wing causes, especially the promotion of human rights. She later became the founder secretary of the Lawyers Collective, an organization that provides legal funding for the underprivileged sections of Indian society. She founded a monthly magazine called The Lawyers, in 1986, which focuses on social justice and women's issues in the context of Indian law. She has been involved in cases related to discrimination against women, the Muslim Personal Law, the rights of pavement dwellers and the homeless and the Bhopal gas tragedy. She has fought against child labor, for the economic rights of women, estranged wives and domestic violence cases. The NGO currently has had its license suspended for violating the FCRA norms.

== Other ==
Jaising has attended several national and international conferences on women, representing her country at these events. Her NGO has been barred by the MHA (Ministry of Home Affairs) from receiving foreign funds. The NGO Lawyers' Collective has had their license suspended for violation of foreign funding norms. However, the Bombay High Court passed an order to defreeze NGO's domestic accounts; the case continues in the Supreme Court

She had a fellowship at the Institute of Advanced Legal Studies in London and has been a visiting Scholar at the Columbia University New York. She was a member of the United Nations Committee on the Elimination of Discrimination against Women. She was conferred with the Rotary Manav Seva Award in recognition of her services to the nation in fighting corruption and as a champion of the weaker sections of the society.

Jaising was given the Padma Shree by the President of India in 2005 for her service to the cause of public affairs. Her husband Anand Grover is a human rights lawyer and designated senior advocate of the Supreme Court. In 2018, she was ranked 20th on the list of 50 Greatest Leaders of the World by Fortune magazine.
