= Lawyers Collective =

Indian nongovernmental organization

Lawyers Collective was a non-governmental organization in India which promotes human rights, especially on issues relating to women's rights, HIV, tobacco, LGBT and parliamentary corruption in India. On 1 June 2016, Govt of India suspended the registration of the NGO under the Foreign Contribution (Regulation) Act, 2010 (FCRA) for alleged violation of FCRA norms. This revoking of the license was challenged in the Bombay High Court and the case is currently pending. The Central Bureau of Investigation filed a first information report on 13 June 2019 relating to charges of criminal conspiracy, criminal breach of trust, cheating, false statement made in declaration and various sections under the FCRA and Prevention of Corruption Act, 1988.

== Founding ==
Lawyers collective was founded in 1981. Among its founders were Indira Jaising and Anand Grover.

== Access to medicines ==
Lawyers Collective represented the Cancer Patients Aid Association in the landmark intellectual property case Novartis v. Union of India., opposing Novartis' patent for Glivec, a life-saving leukemia drug. The case has generated global attention for its impact on access to medicines worldwide. On 1 April 2013, Novartis' patent was rejected by the Supreme Court of India

== HIV issues ==
The Lawyers Collective has written a bill intended for debate in parliament regarding HIV / AIDS discrimination. The purpose of the proposed law is to prohibit discrimination against persons living with HIV. The proposal describes prohibition of discrimination in employment, healthcare, and education, and further prohibits hate and discriminatory propaganda. Anand Grover is the head of the Lawyers Collective HIV/ AIDS unit.

== Decriminalization of homosexuality ==
The Lawyers Collective works closely with the Naz Foundation and acted as their legal team in their lawsuit to repeal Section 377 of the Indian Penal Code.

== Women's rights ==
In 2006 the Lawyers Collective received a grant from the United Nations Development Fund for Women to develop a project titled "Staying Alive – Empowerment through Law." The purpose of this project was to provide legal resources to promote women's rights in the Indian legal system.

== Suspension of FCRA registration ==
On 1 June 2016, the Govt of India suspended the FCRA registration of the NGO for alleged violation of FCRA norms for 6 months pending further procedure. Lawyers Collective in a statement said that it intends to take the matter to the court. The funds received include Ford Foundation. The suspension of the FCRA license was then challenged in the Bombay High Court. The Central Bureau of Investigation filed a first information report on 13 June 2019 relating to charges of criminal conspiracy, criminal breach of trust, cheating, false statement made in declaration and various sections under the FCRA and Prevention of Corruption (PC) Act 1988. Various academics and activists claimed that this was an act of intimidation and harassment.
