= European Journal of Clinical Nutrition =

European peer-reviewed medical journal

- Discipline: Nutrition science
- Language: English
- Edited by: Mario J. Soares

Publication details
- Former names: Journal of Human Nutrition, Human Nutrition, Nutrition
- History: 1947–present
- Publisher: Springer Nature
- Frequency: Monthly
- Open access: Hybrid
- Impact factor: 3.2 (2025)

Standard abbreviations
- ISO 4: Eur. J. Clin. Nutr.

Indexing
- CODEN: EJCNEQ
- ISSN: 0954-3007 (print); 1476-5640 (web)
- LCCN: sn88026529
- OCLC no.: 39737748

Links
- Journal homepage; Online access; Online archive

The European Journal of Clinical Nutrition is a monthly peer-reviewed medical journal covering nutrition science and published by the Springer Nature. It was established in 1947 by John Waterlow as Nutrition and renamed Journal of Human Nutrition in 1976. In 1982 its name was changed to Human Nutrition and the journal was split into two sections: Human Nutrition: Applied Nutrition and Human Nutrition: Clinical Nutrition. These two sections were combined again in 1988 with the journal obtaining its current name. The editor-in-chief is Mario J. Soares (Curtin University).

== Abstracting and indexing ==
The journal is abstracted and indexed in:

- BIOSIS Previews
- CAB Abstracts
- CINAHL
- Current Contents/Clinical Medicine
- Current Contents/Life Sciences
- Elsevier Biobase/Current Awareness in Biological Sciences
- Embase/Excerpta Medica
- Index Medicus/MEDLINE/PubMed
- Science Citation Index
- Scopus

According to the Journal Citation Reports, the European Journal of Clinical Nutrition has a 2025 impact factor of 3.2, ranking it 55th out of 114 journals in the category "Nutrition & Dietetics".
