= Anand Grover =

Indian lawyer

Anand Grover is an Indian lawyer known for legal activism in Indian law relating to homosexuality and HIV. Along with his wife Indira Jaising, he is a founder-member of the Lawyers Collective. He was the United Nations Special Rapporteur on the right to health from August 2008 to July 2014. He is currently an acting member of the Global Commission on Drug Policy.

== Notable cases ==
With the Lawyers Collective Grover led the Naz Foundation's legal case for the repeal of Section 377 of the Indian Penal Code, which was a law criminalizing homosexuality in India.

Grover led the Lawyers Collective court case against Novartis regarding an interpretation of Agreement on Trade-Related Aspects of Intellectual Property Rights which would determine the patent status of antiretroviral drugs in India. The result of the case was that the Lawyers Collective prevailed and certain drugs became ineligible for patenting, thus keeping the price of the medications in line with generic medication costs.

Grover represented the Cancer Patients Aid Association as an attorney and won the legal fight against drug maker Novartis on the issue of patent of cancer drug Glivec. On the night before Yakub Memon was scheduled to be executed, Anand Grover along with other senior lawyers of the Supreme Court, sought appointment from the Chief Justice of India, H. L. Dattu at his residence. After the Chief Justice constituted a 3 Judge bench, Grover argued for the mandatory 14-day period between the rejection of the mercy plea of a condemned prisoner, and the execution of the death warrant, as per the guidelines set by the Supreme Court of India in the Shatrughan Chauhan vs Union of India case. Grover argued that an earlier mercy petition submitted to the President was by his brother, and that since all the legal remedies available to the prisoner, including a curative petition, stood exhausted only a day before his scheduled hanging, only the final mercy petition submitted by Yakub himself must be taken into account while evaluating upon the 14-day period. However the Supreme Court rejected the argument noting that Yakub had not disowned the earlier mercy petition by his brother. The bench commented that delaying Yakub's hanging anymore would amount to travesty of justice. Grover expressed disappointment and unhappiness over the judgement and termed it as a tragic mistake.

Grover represented Shreya Tripathi in her successful efforts to obtain bedaquiline for the treatment of her extensively drug-resistant tuberculosis.

== United Nations work ==
Grover is a member of the UNAIDS Reference Group on HIV and Human Rights and a Special Rapporteur in the United Nations Human Rights Council. His duty in this position is to promote the right to physical and mental health.

== In popular culture ==
In 2015 Hansal Mehta's Bollywood film Aligarh, Actor Ashish Vidyarthi played the role of advocate Anand Grover.
