= Weight gain =

Increase in a person's total body mass

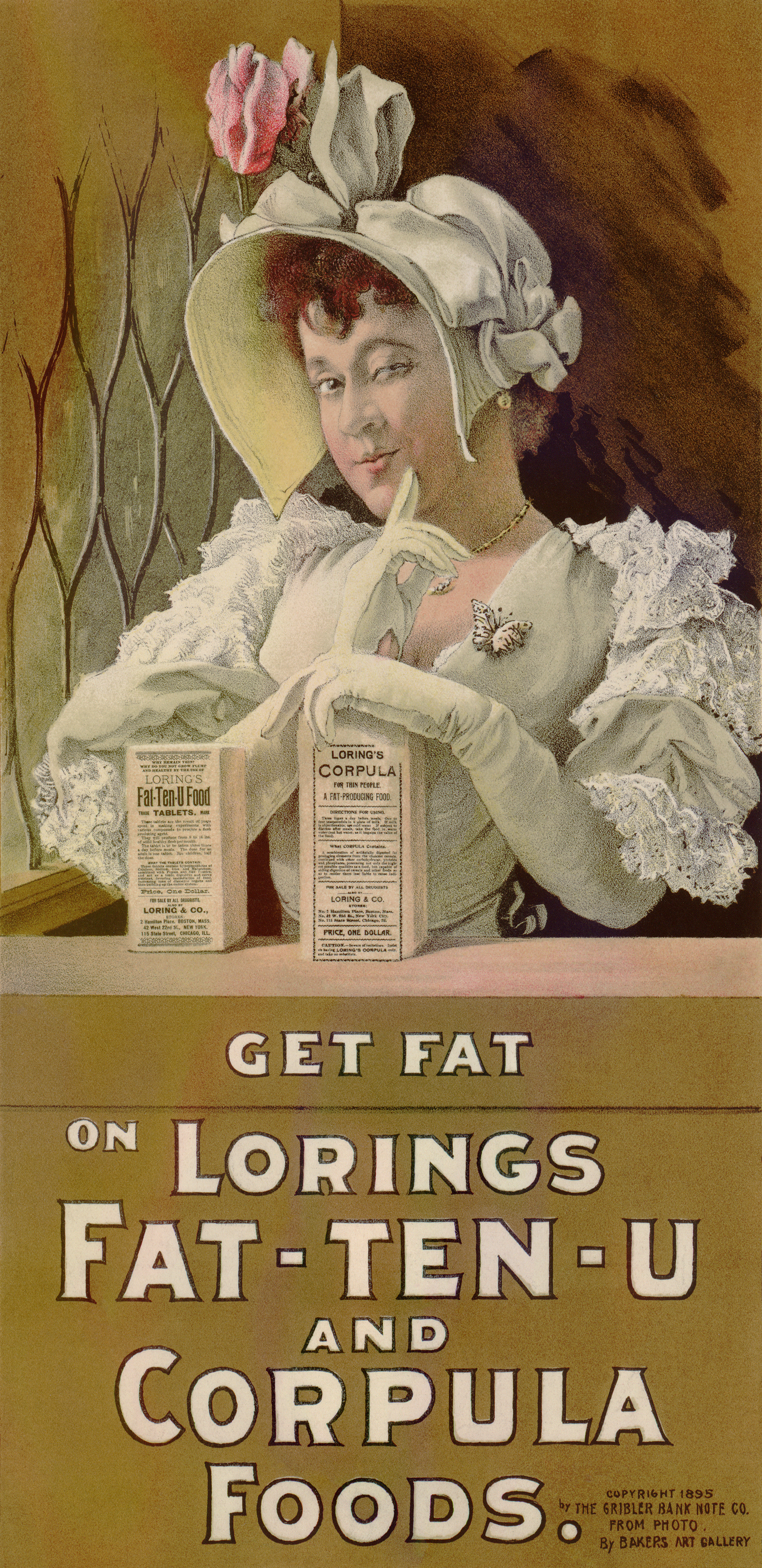
An 1895 advertisement for a weight gain product

Weight gain is an increase in body weight. This can involve an increase in muscle mass, fat deposits, excess fluids such as water or other factors. Weight gain can be a symptom of a serious medical condition.

== Description ==
Weight gain occurs when more energy (as calories from food and beverage consumption) is gained than the energy expended by life activities, including normal physiological processes and physical exercise.

If enough weight is gained due to increased body fat deposits, one may become overweight or obese, generally defined as having more body fat (adipose tissue) than is considered good for health. The Body Mass Index (BMI) measures body weight in proportion to height and defines optimal, insufficient, and excessive weight based on the ratio.

Having excess adipose tissue (fat) is a common condition, especially where food supplies are plentiful and lifestyles are sedentary. Being overweight or having obesity may increase the risk of several diseases, such as diabetes, heart disease, and some cancers, and may lead to short- and long-term health problems during pregnancy. Rates of obesity worldwide tripled from 1975 to 2016 to involve some 1.8 billion people and 39% of the world adult population.

A commonly asserted "rule" (the Wishnofsky Rule, a.k.a. Wishnofsky's Rule) for weight gain or loss, is based on the research of Max Wishnofsky (December 17, 1899 – August 2, 1965), a Russian-born physician who had a medical practice in Brooklyn, New York. The Wishnofsky Rule states that one pound of human fat tissue contains about 3,500 kilocalories (often simply called calories in the field of nutrition). Wishnofsky conducted a review of previous observations and experiments on weight loss and weight gain, and stated his conclusions in a paper he published in 1958. Thus, according to the Wishnofsky Rule, eating 500 fewer calories than one needs per day should result in a loss of about a pound per week. Similarly, for every 3500 calories consumed above the amount one needs, a pound will be gained.

Wishnofsky noted that previous research suggested that a pound of human adipose tissue is 87% fat, which equals 395 grams of fat. He further assumed that animal fat contains 9.5 calories per gram. Thus one pound of human fat tissue should contain 3750 calories. He then critically analyzed the relevant literature and applied a number of additional assumptions, including that the diet contains sufficient protein and that the person is in glycogen and nitrogen (protein) equilibrium, leading to most weight loss stemming from the catabolism of fat. He concluded that a 3500 calorie excess or deficit for a person meeting his assumptions, would lead to the gain or loss, respectively, of one pound of body weight. He noted that if the assumptions he made are not met, a deficit of 3500 calories would not necessarily equate to a pound of weight loss.

Wishnofsky did not take into account numerous aspects of human physiology and biochemistry which were unknown at the time. The claim has achieved the status of a rule of thumb and is repeated in numerous sources, used for diet planning by dietitians and misapplied at the population level as well.

== Causes ==
In regard to adipose tissue increases, a person generally gains weight by increasing food consumption, becoming physically inactive, or both. When energy intake exceeds energy expenditure (when the body is in positive energy balance), the body can store the excess energy as fat. However, the physiology of weight gain and loss is complex involving numerous hormones, body systems and environmental factors. Other factors besides energy balance that may contribute to gaining weight include:

=== Social factors ===
A study, involving more than 12,000 people tracked over 32 years, found that social networks play a surprisingly powerful role in determining an individual's chances of gaining weight, transmitting an increased risk of becoming obese from wives to husbands, from brothers to brothers and from friends to friends.

The human microbiota facilitates fermentation of indigestible carbohydrates to short-chain fatty acids, SCFAs, contributing to weight gain. A change in the proportion of Bacteroidetes and Firmicutes may determine host's risk of obesity.

=== Sleep and stress ===
Lack of sufficient sleep has been suggested as a cause for weight gain or the difficulty in maintaining a healthy weight. Two hormones responsible for regulating hunger and metabolism are leptin, which inhibits appetite and increases energy expenditure, and ghrelin, which increases appetite and reduces energy expenditure. Studies have shown that chronic sleep deprivation is associated with reduced levels of leptin and elevated levels of ghrelin, which together result in increased appetite, especially for high fat and high carbohydrate foods. As a result, sleep deprivation over time may contribute to increased caloric intake and decreased self-control over food cravings, leading to weight gain.

=== Hormone and neurotransmitter imbalances ===
Weight gain is a common side-effect of certain psychiatric medications.

=== Pathologies ===
Pathological causes of weight gain include Cushing's syndrome, hypothyroidism, insulinoma, and craniopharyngioma. Genetic reasons can relate to Prader–Willi syndrome, Bardet–Biedl syndrome, Alström syndrome, Cohen syndrome, and Carpenter syndrome.

== Effects ==
Excess adipose tissue can lead to medical problems; however, a round or large figure does not necessarily imply a medical problem, and is sometimes not primarily caused by adipose tissue. If too much weight is gained, serious health side effects may follow. A large number of medical conditions have been associated with obesity. Health consequences are categorised as being the result of either increased fat mass (osteoarthritis, obstructive sleep apnea, social stigma) or increased number of fat cells (diabetes, some forms of cancer, cardiovascular disease, metabolic dysfunction–associated steatotic liver disease). There are alterations in the body's response to insulin (insulin resistance), a proinflammatory state and an increased tendency to thrombosis (prothrombotic state).

== See also ==
- Healthy diet – Type of diet
- Fad diet – Diet with unscientific claims
- Fat feminism – Social movement
- Fat acceptance movement – Social movement against anti-fat bias
- Satiety value – Degree at which food gives a human the feeling of satiety per calorie
- Weight loss – Reduction of the total body mass
