= Sleep and metabolism =

Sleep is important in regulating metabolism. Mammalian sleep can be sub-divided into two distinct phases - REM (rapid eye movement) and non-REM (NREM) sleep. In humans and cats, NREM sleep has four stages, where the third and fourth stages are considered slow-wave sleep (SWS). SWS is considered deep sleep, when metabolism is least active.

Metabolism involves two biochemical processes that occur in living organisms. The first is anabolism, which refers to the build up of molecules. The second is catabolism, the breakdown of molecules. These two processes work to regulate the amount of energy the body uses to maintain itself. During non-REM sleep, metabolic rate and brain temperature are lowered to deal with damages that may have occurred during time of wakefulness.

== Normal metabolism ==
After eating, the pancreas releases insulin. Insulin signals muscle and fat cells to absorb glucose from food. As a result, blood glucose levels return to normal.

== Sleep loss and Type 2 diabetes ==
=== Insulin-Resistant Metabolism ===
Several studies suggest that the association between sleep loss, obesity, and diabetes risk, may be driven by several factors. Three main examples are altered glucose metabolism, increased appetite, and lower energy expenditure.

Baseline levels of insulin do not signal muscle and fat cells to absorb glucose. When glucose levels are elevated, the pancreas responds by releasing insulin. Blood sugar will then rapidly drop. This can progress to type 2 diabetes. Sleep variations, both in quantity and quality, may affect metabolic regulation in type 2 diabetes. Additional data has shown a correlation between sleep quality and type 2 diabetes risk.

Sleep loss can affect the basic metabolic functions of storing carbohydrates and regulating hormones. Reduction of sleep from eight hours to four hours produces changes in glucose tolerance and endocrine function. Researchers from the University of Chicago Medical Center followed 11 healthy young men for 16 consecutive nights. The first 3 nights, the young men slept for the normal 8 hours. The next 6 nights, they slept for 4 hours. The next 7 nights, they spent 12 hours in bed. They all had the same diet. They found that there were changes in glucose metabolism that resemble that of type 2 diabetes patients. When the participants were tested after sleep deprivation, they took 40% longer than normal to regulate blood sugar levels after a high-carbohydrate meal. The secretion of insulin and the body's response to insulin decrease by 30%. Sleep deprivation also alters the productions of hormones, lowering the secretion of thyroid stimulating hormone and increasing blood levels of cortisol. Increased cortisol levels in turn induce insulin resistance, resulting in raised blood glucose.

It has also been shown that when slow-wave sleep was suppressed for three nights, young healthy subjects were 25% less sensitive to insulin. They needed more insulin to get rid of the same amount of glucose. If the body does not release more insulin to compensate, the blood-glucose levels will increase. This resembles impaired glucose tolerance, which can result in type 2 diabetes.

== Sleep loss and appetite control ==
Sleep plays a vital role in regulating metabolism and appetite. When sleep deprived, the metabolic system will be out of balance, which will ultimately affect the dietary choices people make. Teens who are sleep deprived crave more carbohydrates. Sleep deprivation is a risk factor for obesity among young adults.

There are two hormones, leptin and ghrelin, that are important in appetite control. Leptin, released by adipose tissue, is a hormone that inhibits appetite and increases energy expenditure. Ghrelin, released from the stomach, is a hormone that increases appetite and reduces energy expenditure. In a study where subjects were restricted to 4 hours of sleep per night for 2 nights, leptin levels decreased by 18% and ghrelin levels increased by 28%. In addition, there was an increase in hunger rating by 23%, with leptin levels being a significant predictor of hunger levels. Subjects also preferred high carbohydrate foods (sweets, salty food and starchy food), and craving for salty food increased by 45%. Sleep deprivation may cause people to intake food for emotional/psychological need rather than caloric need of the body.

== Sleep loss and obesity ==
Chronic sleep deprivation (less than 8 hours of sleep) is associated with an increase in body mass index (BMI) and obesity. In a study with 3000 patients, it was found that men and women who sleep less than 5 hours have elevated body mass index (BMI). In another study that followed about 70.000 women for 16 years, there was a significant increase in body weight in those who slept 5 hours or less compared to those who slept 7–8 hours.

As sleep time decreased over time from the 1950s to 2000s from about 8.5 hours to 6.5 hours, there has been an increase in the prevalence of obesity from about 10% to about 23%.

Weight gain itself may also lead to a lack of sleep as obesity can negatively affect quality of sleep, as well as increase risk of sleeping disorders such as sleep apnea.

== Sleep loss and skeletal muscle metabolism ==
Sleep loss also affects the metabolism of skeletal muscle. Insufficient sleep has been shown to decrease myofibrillar and sarcoplasmic muscle protein synthesis and contribute to the development of muscle atrophy.

Studies have also shown that detrimental effects on muscle protein synthesis caused by sleep loss can be mitigated by exercise.
