= CICO =

CICO is the abbreviation of:

- Chongqing International Construction Corporation, a Chinese construction and engineering company
- One of TVOntario's call signs
- Calorie in, calorie out
