= Global Energy Balance Network =

US-based nonprofit organization

- Founded: 2014; 12 years ago at the University of Colorado and University of South Carolina
- Dissolved: November 30, 2015
- Type: Non-profit
- Purpose: Front group for Coca-Cola
- Products: Obesity research
- Owner: Coca-Cola
- President: James O. Hill
- Founder & Vice-President: Steven N. Blair
- Founder: Gregory A. Hand
- Website: gebn.org (was registered to Coca-Cola headquarters in Atlanta)

The Global Energy Balance Network (GEBN) was a US-based nonprofit organization claiming to fund research into causes of obesity, but was primarily known for promoting the idea that lack of physical exercise, not bad diet, was primarily responsible for the obesity epidemic. It has been characterised as an astroturfing organisation. It received substantial funding from Coca-Cola. It has been criticised by nutrition experts for downplaying the role of junk food in obesity. Critics have also accused the American College of Sports Medicine (ACSM) of supporting GEBN. The ACSM claims it had no affiliation with GEBN.

GEBN's view of weight and metabolic health promoted the idea that weight loss can be achieved by taking more exercise while maintaining the same level of consumption - this view "crosses a line by advancing a view that falls outside the scientific consensus", and presents an overly simplistic view of the energy balance equation, with experts noting that "evidence for eating less as a weight-loss strategy is much, much stronger than the evidence for moving more".

== Outcome ==
Coca-Cola was given a 2015 Shonky Award by Australian consumer organisation Choice, due to its funding of GEBN, which amounted to at least $1.5m in 2015.

On November 30, 2015, the group announced on its website that it would discontinue operations immediately. Shortly before this, the chief public scientist at Coca-Cola announced her retirement. Coca-Cola did not replace the position.

On August 2, 2016, it was announced Gregory Hand would be forced out as the Founding Dean of the West Virginia University School of Public Health.

As of March 2020, a simplified (partly German-language) version of the website is up.
