= Portal hypothesis =

Possible mechanism for obesity health effects

The portal hypothesis describes a possible mechanism for some of the health effects of obesity, particularly the metabolic syndrome. It says that obesity (especially visceral obesity) results in increased circulation of free fatty acids and thus, via Randle's effect, in insulin resistance.

The word "portal" refers to the hepatic portal circulation from the digestive system to the liver. The portal-visceral hypothesis is a replacement for the earlier "portal hypothesis", which said that visceral obesity leads to an increase in fatty acid levels specifically in the portal vein.

Later research did not favor the portal hypothesis. It was determined that liver fat accumulation, as opposed to total visceral fat, was correlated with reduced insulin sensitivity and increased VLDL. Additionally, most of the free fatty acids reaching the liver via the portal vein do not originate in visceral fat, rather they are generated largely by abdominal subcutaneous fat. The later adipose tissue expandability hypothesis hypothesizes that the cause of type 2 diabetes is not obesity, but reaching the limit of what an individual's adipose tissue is able to store. This capacity limit varies between individuals and can be very low for people with lipodystrophy.
