= A calorie is a calorie =

Expression suggesting all dietary calories are the same

"A calorie is a calorie" is an expression used to convey the concept that sources of dietary energy are interchangeable. This concept has been subject of debate since its emergence in the early 19th century.

== History ==
In 1883, German nutritionist Max Rubner published what he called the "isodynamic law". The law claims that the basis of nutrition is the exchange of energy. In the early 1900s, Carl von Noorden applied isodynamic law to the study of obesity and developed two theories on what caused people to develop obesity. The first repeated Rubner's notion that "a calorie is a calorie". The second claimed that obesity is a consequence of how the body partitions calories for use or storage. These competing theories continue to be a source of dispute within nutrition and diet communities.

== Metabolism ==
In thermodynamics, energy cannot be created or destroyed, only converted from one form to another. In nutrition, dietary energy refers to metabolizable energy, not gross energy. The level of absorption and the thermic effect of food (TEF) both affect how much energy is made available to the body.

Absorption is the mechanism by which the human body ingests energy from food. Absorption occurs mostly in the small intestine. A relatively lesser amount of absorption—composed primarily of water—occurs in the large intestine. Energy recovered from food is used to digest and metabolize it, and to store any remaining food.

About 10% of the energy recovered from food is burned as heat, during a process called diet-induced thermogenesis (DIT), specific dynamic action (SDA), or thermic effect of food (TEF).

== Calorie counting ==
A kilocalorie is equivalent to 1000 calories or one dietary Calorie, which contains 4184 joules of energy. The notion that "a calorie is a calorie" has been used to suggest that body weight maintenance is a matter of balancing calorie intake and energy expenditure, and reducing calorie intake has been recommended as a way to reduce and maintain weight.

Calorie amounts displayed on food labels are based on the Atwater system. The accuracy of the system is disputed. In some cases the system has been found to overestimate metabolizable energy by 3–7%. A 2012 study by a USDA scientist concluded that the measured energy content of a sample of almonds was 32% lower than the estimated Atwater value.

== See also ==
- Basal metabolic rate
- Dieting
- Empty calories
- Management of obesity
- Metabolism
- Exercise
- Satiety value
- Scientific control
- Sleep and metabolism
- Bioavailability
