= James O. Hill =

American obesity researcher

- Born: James Oakley Hill; 1951 (age 74–75); Crossville, Tennessee
- Education: University of Tennessee; University of New Hampshire
- Known for: Research on obesity
- Awards: Elected to National Academy of Medicine
- Scientific career
- Fields: Nutrition science
- Institutions: University of Colorado School of Medicine; University of Alabama at Birmingham
- Thesis: Dietary Obesity, Exercise Training, and Thermogenesis in Rats (1981)

James O. Hill (born 1951 in Crossville, Tennessee) is an American obesity researcher who serves as director of the NIH-funded Nutrition Obesity Research Center in the University of Alabama at Birmingham. In 2022, he received a five-year, $10.8 million award as part of the Nutrition for Precision Health (NPH) study through the National Institutes of Health's All of Us Research Program. He served as chair of the Department of Nutrition Sciences in the UAB School of Health Professions from 2018 - 2022. Hill previously served on the faculty of the University of Colorado School of Medicine, where his positions included director of the Colorado Nutrition Obesity Research Center, director of the Center for Human Nutrition, and founding executive director of the Anschutz Health and Wellness Center. He was elected to the National Academy of Medicine in 2014, and has served as president of the American Society for Nutrition and the Obesity Society. He is the co-founder of America on the Move, a non-profit organization promoting lifestyle changes to counteract obesity and related health problems, and the National Weight Control Registry, a prospective study of long-term weight loss that was the largest of its kind as of 2018.
