= Anti-Obesity Day =

Health awareness day

World Anti Obesity Day

Anti-Obesity Day (AOD) is observed in various parts of the world on November 26, with several healthcare organizations and leading Media primarily in India and the Gulf Cooperation Council (GCC) countries marking the day with activities to highlight how obesity is a public health hazard.

In 2001, the Indian Wellness brand VLCC, founded by Vandana Luthra, created an anti-obesity initiative to spread awareness about Obesity and to promote the development of good lifestyle habits to stay healthy and fit.

With "the active involvement of the medical fraternity", VLCC started observing November 26 as Anti-Obesity Day, as part of an annual campaign conducted in the months of November and December.

VLCC’s anti-obesity campaign includes organizing health camps, mass counseling sessions, and talk-shows with health experts, besides extensive media interactions, and dissemination of special literature on obesity.

VLCC’s Anti-Obesity Day™ initiative has received wide coverage in the Media with articles on this appearing on this in several key mainstream and specialized media in India and the GCC countries, which include publications such as Times of India, NDTV., The Hindu, Metropolis Indiaand Muscat Daily.
