= Parental obesity =

Obesity of a parent during pregnancy

Maternal obesity refers to obesity (often including being overweight) of a woman during pregnancy. Parental obesity refers to obesity of either parent during pregnancy.

Maternal obesity significantly affects maternal metabolism and offspring development. It disrupts insulin resistance, glucose homeostasis, fat oxidation, and amino acid synthesis, contributing to adverse outcomes. Lifestyle modification is an effective strategy to improve maternal metabolism and prevent complications.

Obesity is defined as having a Body Mass Index (BMI) of 30 or greater. A 5-foot-5-inch tall woman would be considered obese if she weighs 180 pounds or more and a 5-foot-8-inch tall woman would be considered obese if she weighs 200 pounds or more. About one third of women of the reproductive ages are overweight with a BMI greater than or equal to twenty-five.

== Effects on the fetus ==
=== Defects/ impairments ===
Between 18 and 38% of pregnant women in the US are classified as obese. However, little is known about the link between maternal obesity and diabetic effects in offspring. Maternal obesity is associated with increased odds of pregnancies affected by congenital anomalies, including neural tube defects and spina bifida. The chances of having neural tube defects in the newborn of an obese woman has been shown to be twice that of a non-obese pregnant female. Some other anomalies that were increased among mothers with obesity included septal anomalies, cleft palate, cleft lip and palate, anorectal atresia, hydrocephaly, and limb reduction anomalies. Babies are also more likely to be admitted to neonatal intensive care units because of effects from the obese mother. Each year, nearly 2,500 babies are born with these defects, and many other affected pregnancies end in miscarriage and stillbirth.

=== Mental or physical effects on the fetus ===
Maternal obesity is linked with elective preterm delivery, neonatal death, and delivery of an extremely low birth weight infant. In follow-up studies of babies whose birth weights were below 1000g, it was shown that 40% to 45% of the survivors had severe neurodevelopmental impairments.

It has been demonstrated through a study on rats that when a pregnant mother ate a diet rich in fat, sugar, and salt, that mother's offspring was more likely to overeat and have a preference for junk food. Even when the offspring were not given the option of junk food, their bodies metabolized food differently from offspring whose mother ate healthier. Offspring of mothers who ate badly had higher levels of cholesterol and triglycerides in their bloodstream and higher risk of heart disease. In addition, these offspring had higher levels of glucose and insulin, which indicate development of type 2 diabetes. The rats were studied through adulthood and were found to be fatter than the offspring whose mothers ate healthier. This study showed that the diet of mothers not only affects the offspring's chemical physiology but also their likelihood of becoming even more unhealthy through their natural preference to bad habits.

Fetal macrosomia, maternal obesity and excessive weight gain during pregnancy are associated with later obesity in childhood and adolescence. As early as at age 6 years, children of women who were obese before they became pregnant had more often a cardiometabolic risk profile compared to children of normal-weight mothers.

=== Paternal obesity effects on the fetus ===
Researchers from the NIH's National Institute of Diabetes and Digestive and Kidney Diseases (NIDDK) conducted a study and found that early-onset paternal obesity is connected with an increased risk of liver disease in their kin. Researchers found that obese fathers had an elevated level of serum alanine aminotransferase (ALT), a liver enzyme, compared to fathers who were not obese. They did a secondary analysis that excluded obese offspring. Children who were a normal weight but had obese fathers still had elevated ALT levels, which indicated that a child's ALT levels are not dependent upon the child's own BMI.

== Obesity effects on the mother ==
=== Disease ===
Obese women have an increased risk of pregnancy-related complications, including hypertension, gestational diabetes, and blood clots. Also, the mother is at risk of going into preterm labor. Maternal obesity is also known to be associated with increased rates of complications in late pregnancy such as cesarean delivery, and shoulder dystocia. A meta-analysis estimated that Cesarean delivery rates increased with odds ratios of 1.5 among overweight, 2 among obese, and 3 among severely obese women, compared with normal weight pregnant women. In addition, morbidly obese women who have not had children before are at increased risk of all–cause preterm deliveries. It is well recognized that obese women are at increased risk of preeclampsia and that women who have never been pregnant are at higher risk of preeclampsia than women who have had children in the past. Obesity in pregnancy is also known to be associated with hyperinsulinemia, dyslipidemia, impaired endothelial function, and up-regulated markers of inflammation.

=== Effects of negative diets ===
Poor glycemic control can lead to neural tube defects. The usual increase in insulin resistance seen in late pregnancy is enhanced in obese mothers, causing a postprandial increase in glucose, lipids, and amino acids, as well as excessive fetal exposure to fuel sources. This, in turn, increases fetal size, fat storage, and potential risk for disease. For mothers, impaired glucose tolerance and hyperlipidemia are more common among obese mothers.

== Modifying the Risks ==
There are many options available in treating obesity, such as: altering one's diet and exercising regularly. Regular exercise during pregnancy has been shown to reduce gestational weight gain and reduce the risk of developing obesity related health conditions, such as gestational diabetes, hypertensive disorders, and preeclampsia in the mother. Additionally, regular exercise during pregnancy has been shown to reduce the incidence of adverse fetal health conditions, such as preterm birth, macrosomia, and gestational age discrepancies. Some people who are obese turn to gastric bypass surgery in order to reduce their appetites. It is always advised to consult a physician regarding any obesity treatment.

It is recommended that obese women should try to lose weight before becoming pregnant, yet women should not diet during pregnancy because sufficient nutrition is important for pregnant women and women planning pregnancy. Women with gastric banding can have normal pregnancies and better outcomes than women who do not have the surgery, but in most cases, doctors have agreed that pregnancy should wait until surgery-related weight loss has stabilized. Clinicians have been encouraged to talk to women who are pregnant or may become pregnant about getting enough folic acid, quitting smoking, and avoiding alcohol. Women are also recommended to have appropriate calorie intake and exercise adequately.

== Nutrition recommendations ==
Pregnant women who ate more sweets, such as candy and processed juices, in early pregnancy were at higher risk of gaining excessive weight. A healthy, well-balanced diet during pregnancy can also help to minimize some pregnancy symptoms such as nausea and constipation.

Pregnant women should be encouraged to follow the gestational weight gain guidelines according to their pre-pregnancy BMI, so to best avoid excessive weight gain during their pregnancy, while still providing the nutrients required for healthy fetal development.

== Exercise recommendations ==
During pregnancy, women should engage in regular physical activity. A large variety of exercise programs and modalities are available and safe for women to perform while pregnant, and should be encouraged for women, regardless of BMI, to include during the duration of their pregnancy. Current exercise recommendation guidelines state that pregnant women should be active for at least 150 minutes a week, most preferably through daily physical activity, at a moderate intensity. Previously sedentary mothers should begin light exercise of a short duration, and progress to longer duration and more intense exercise. Doctors state that exercise can help the comfort of the mother and the well-being of the unborn child. Some benefits include, but are not limited to: reduced back pain, decrease in constipation, less likely to gain excess weight, decreased chance of gestational diabetes, easier labor, quicker recovery, and better physical and emotional health of the baby. Exercises performed in the supine position are not recommended after the first trimester, as well as extended periods of standing still. Both positions have been linked to reduced cardiac output. Additionally, prolonged Valsalva maneuvers during isometric exercises, like weight lifting, should be avoided because they may lead to decreased blood flow to the digestive organs and uterus.

If negative signs and symptoms occur after exercising, pregnant females should stop immediately. Some signs include: dizziness, faintness, headache, shortness of breath, uterine contractions, vaginal bleeding, fluid leaking, or heart palpitations.
