= Steven Blair =

American exercise scientist (1939–2023)

- Born: Steven Noel Blair; July 4, 1939; Mankato, Kansas, U.S.
- Died: October 6, 2023 (aged 84)
- Education: Kansas Wesleyan University; Indiana University Bloomington
- Known for: Exercise physiology
- Spouse: Jane Marie Pottberg (m. 1965)
- Children: 2: Ann Blair Kennedy and Max Blair
- Awards: Population Science Research Prize from the American Heart Association (2008)
- Scientific career
- Fields: Exercise science
- Institutions: University of South Carolina
- Thesis: The Effect of Critical and Non-critical Stimuli and Simple and Complex Movements Upon Reaction Time and Movement Time (1968)

Steven Noel Blair (July 4, 1939 – October 6, 2023) was an American exercise scientist. He has been a tenured professor in the Department of Exercise Science and Epidemiology and Biostatistics in the University of South Carolina's Arnold School of Public Health since 2006. He previously worked at the Dallas, Texas-based Cooper Institute, of which he was president and CEO from 2002 to 2006. He is known for his research on the health benefits of physical exercise. A 2005 New York Times article described Blair as "one of the nation's leading experts on the health benefits of exercise".

Blair died on October 6, 2023, at the age of 84.

== Awards and degrees ==
Blair's awards include the American Heart Association's Population Science Research Prize, the President's Council on Sports, Fitness, and Nutrition Lifetime Achievement Award, and the Bloomberg Manulife Prize from McGill University. He was also a fellow of the American Epidemiological Society, the American Heart Association, the American College of Sports Medicine, the National Academy of Kinesiology, the Society of Behavioral Medicine, and the Obesity Society. Inducted in 1985, he is Fellow #302 in the National Academy of Kinesiology (formerly American Academy of Physical Education; American Academy of Kinesiology and Physical Education). He has served as president of the American College of Sports Medicine, the American Academy of Kinesiology and Physical Education, and the National Coalition for Promoting Physical Activity. He held three honorary degrees: a Doctor Honoris Causa degree from the Free University of Brussels, a Doctor of Health Science degree from Lander University, and a Doctor of Science Honoris Causa degree from the University of Bristol.

== Funding by the soft drink industry ==
In 2015, Blair came under scrutiny after the New York Times reported that he had received $3.5 million in research grants from the Coca-Cola Company since 2008. $500,000 of this money was used by Blair to help establish the Global Energy Balance Network (GEBN), a non-profit organization which was criticized for attempting to downplay the contribution of soft drink consumption to obesity. The University of South Carolina refused to return the grant, with a university spokesperson saying that the research funded by the grant was "...conducted ethically and within all applicable guidelines". Blair insisted that Coca-Cola had no influence over the GEBN's work or messaging.
