= Adipose tissue expandability hypothesis =

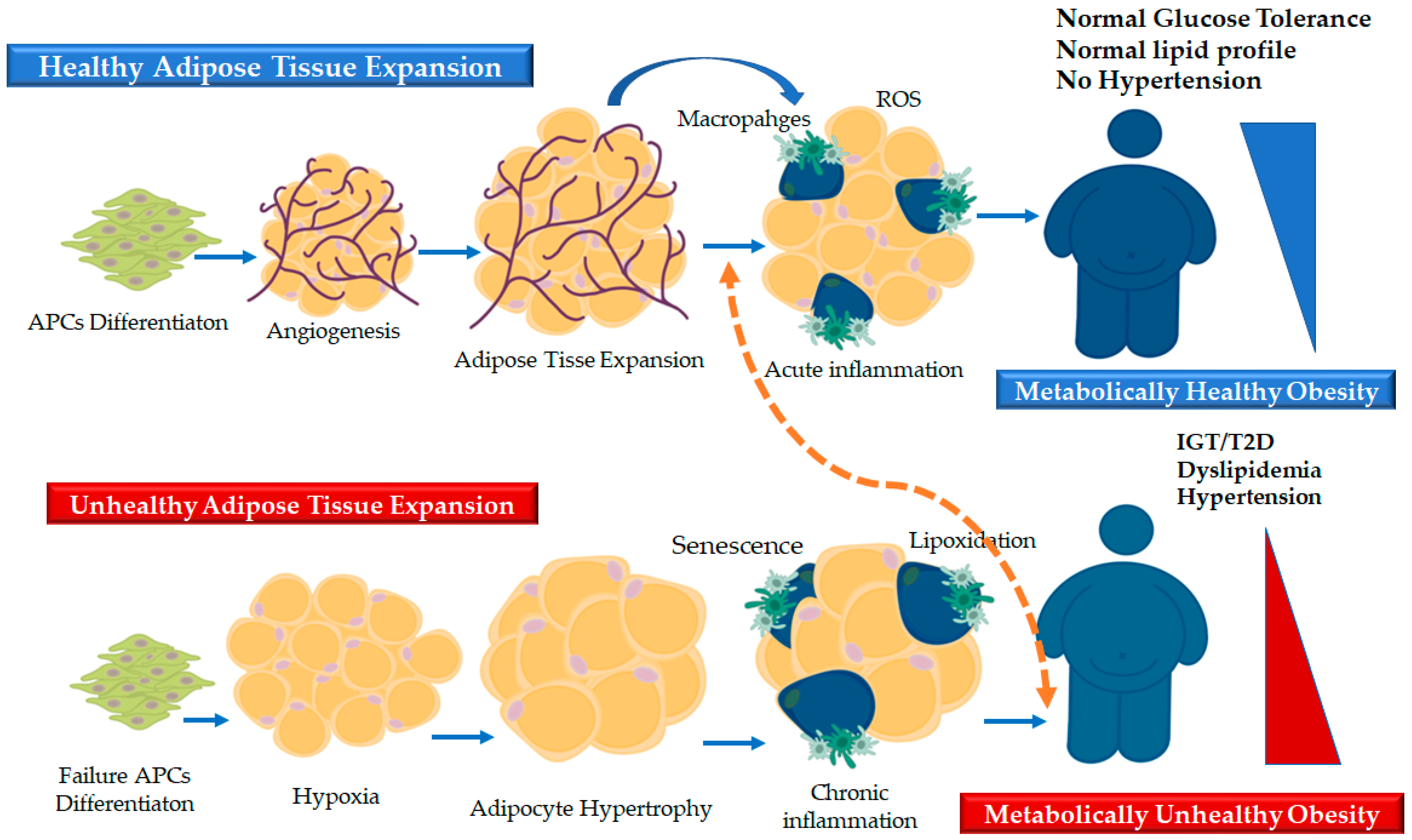
Version of the hypothesis implicating failure to generate more adipocytes in tissue expandability

The adipose tissue expandability hypothesis posits that metabolic dysregulation that appears to be caused by excess weight, such as type 2 diabetes and metabolic dysfunction–associated steatotic liver disease, are triggered when an individual's capacity for storing excess calories in the subcutaneous adipose tissue is exceeded. Each individual's capacity to store excess energy varies, so the threshold at which an individual begins to experience metabolic disease is not well captured by methods such as body mass index or body fat percentage. If a person has the ability to store a large amount of body fat without experiencing metabolic disturbance, this is known as metabolically healthy obesity.

Although it was hypothesized that having a larger number of smaller adipocytes was correlated with the ability to store more fat, some evidence suggests the opposite—those with smaller adipocytes having a worse metabolic profile. The core factor, the inability to store excess fat in these cells, remains.
