= Metabolic syndrome =

Cluster of diseases occurring with obesity

- Other names: Dysmetabolic syndrome X
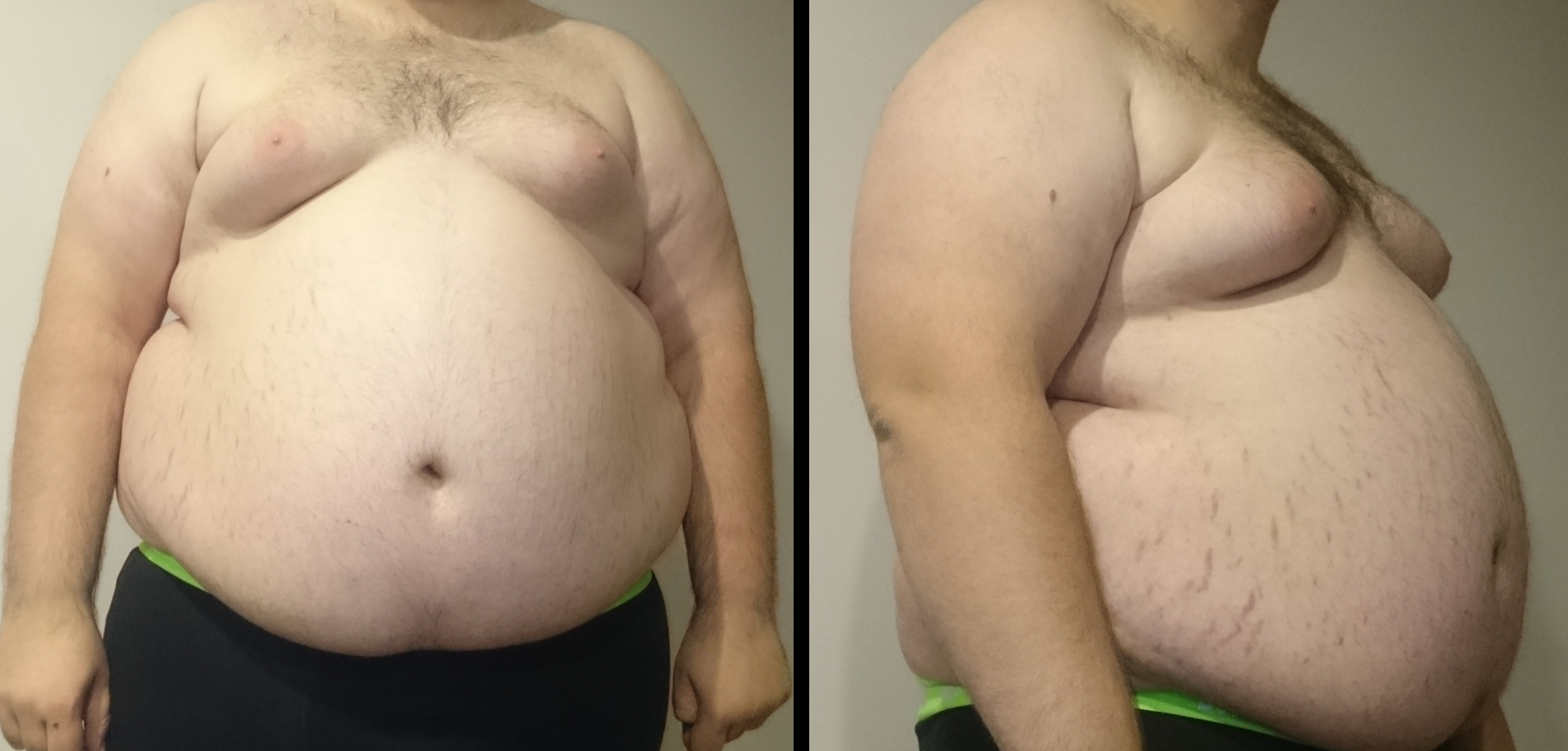
- A man with marked central obesity, a hallmark of metabolic syndrome. His weight is 182 kg (400 lbs), height 185 cm (6 ft 1 in), and body mass index (BMI) 53 (normal 18.5 to 24.9).
- Specialty: Endocrinology
- Symptoms: Obesity
- Differential diagnosis: Acanthosis nigricans, erectile dysfunction, hyperuricemia, insulin resistance, nonalcoholic fatty liver disease, obesity, polyendocrine metabolic ovarian syndrome, prediabetes

Metabolic syndrome is a clustering of at least three of the following five medical conditions: abdominal obesity, high blood pressure, high blood sugar, high serum triglycerides, and low serum high-density lipoprotein (HDL).

Metabolic syndrome is associated with the risk of developing cardiovascular disease and type 2 diabetes. In the U.S., about 25% of the adult population has metabolic syndrome, a proportion increasing with age, particularly among racial and ethnic minorities.

Insulin resistance, metabolic syndrome, and prediabetes are closely related to one another and have overlapping aspects. The syndrome is thought to be caused by an underlying disorder of energy utilization and storage, but the cause of the syndrome is an area of ongoing medical research. Researchers debate whether a diagnosis of metabolic syndrome implies differential treatment or increases risk of cardiovascular disease beyond what is suggested by the sum of its individual components.

== Signs and symptoms ==
The key sign of metabolic syndrome is central obesity, also known as visceral, male-pattern or apple-shaped adiposity. It is characterized by adipose tissue accumulation predominantly around the waist and trunk. Other signs of metabolic syndrome include high blood pressure, decreased fasting serum HDL cholesterol, elevated fasting serum triglyceride level, impaired fasting glucose, insulin resistance, or prediabetes. Associated conditions include hyperuricemia; fatty liver (especially in concurrent obesity) progressing to nonalcoholic fatty liver disease; polyendocrine metabolic ovarian syndrome in women and erectile dysfunction in men; and acanthosis nigricans.

=== Complications ===
Metabolic syndrome can lead to type 2 diabetes, cardiovascular diseases, stroke, kidney disease, and nonalcoholic fatty liver disease. It is also associated with a moderately increased risk of surgical complications.

== Causes ==
The mechanisms underlying metabolic syndrome are under investigation and only partially elucidated. Most affected people are older, obese, sedentary, and have some degree of insulin resistance. Stress can also contribute. Important risk factors include diet (particularly sugar-sweetened beverages), genetics, aging, sedentary behavior or low physical activity, disrupted chronobiology/sleep, mood disorders and some medications, and excessive alcohol use. The pathogenic role of excessive adipose expansion under sustained overeating and resulting lipotoxicity has also been proposed.

Markers of systemic inflammation including C-reactive protein, fibrinogen, interleukin 6, and tumor necrosis factor-alpha (TNF-α) are often increased. Some research has focused on increased uric acid levels from dietary fructose.

Modern "Western diet" patterns with high intake of energy-dense processed foods are a factor in the development of metabolic syndrome. Rather than total adiposity, the core clinical component is visceral/ectopic fat, and the principal metabolic abnormality is insulin resistance. A chronic energy surplus unmatched by activity may lead to mitochondrial dysfunction and insulin resistance.

=== Stress ===
Prolonged chronic stress may contribute to metabolic syndrome via dysregulation of the hypothalamic–pituitary–adrenal axis. Elevated cortisol can raise glucose and insulin levels, promoting visceral adiposity, insulin resistance, dyslipidaemia, and hypertension, and has effects on bone turnover.

== Diagnosis ==
=== NCEP ===
As of 2023, the U.S. National Cholesterol Education Program Adult Treatment Panel III (2001) remains widely used. It requires at least three of the following:

- Central obesity: waist circumference ≥102 cm (40 in) men; ≥88 cm (35 in) women
- Dyslipidaemia: TG ≥1.7 mmol/L (150 mg/dL)
- Dyslipidaemia: HDL-C <40 mg/dL (men), <50 mg/dL (women)
- Blood pressure ≥130/85 mmHg (or treated for hypertension)
- Fasting plasma glucose ≥6.1 mmol/L (110 mg/dL)

=== 2009 Interim Joint Statement ===
The International Diabetes Federation Task Force and partner organisations harmonised criteria in 2009. Diagnosis is three or more of:

- Elevated waist circumference (population- and country-specific)
- Triglycerides ≥150 mg/dL (1.7 mmol/L)
- Reduced HDL-C (≤40 mg/dL (1.0 mmol/L) men; ≤50 mg/dL (1.3 mmol/L) women)
- Elevated blood pressure (systolic ≥130 and/or diastolic ≥85 mmHg)
- Fasting glucose ≥100 mg/dL (5.55 mmol/L)

This statement recognises population differences in waist risk thresholds and encourages common criteria with agreed cut points for international comparisons.

The prior IDF and revised NCEP definitions are similar, but differ on assumptions when body mass index ≥30 kg/m^{2} and on geography-specific waist cut points.

=== WHO ===
The World Health Organization (1999) requires one of diabetes mellitus, impaired glucose tolerance, impaired fasting glucose or insulin resistance and two of:

- Blood pressure ≥140/90 mmHg
- Dyslipidemia: TG ≥1.695 mmol/L and HDL-C ≤0.9 mmol/L (men), ≤1.0 mmol/L (women)
- Central obesity: waist:hip ratio >0.90 (men); >0.85 (women), or BMI >30 kg/m^{2}
- Microalbuminuria: urinary albumin excretion ≥20 μg/min or albumin:creatinine ≥30 mg/g

=== EGIR ===
The European Group for the Study of Insulin Resistance (1999) requires insulin resistance (top 25% fasting insulin among nondiabetic individuals) and two or more of:

- Central obesity: waist ≥94 cm (37 in) men; ≥80 cm (31.5 in) women
- Dyslipidaemia: TG ≥2.0 mmol/L (177 mg/dL) and/or HDL-C <1.0 mmol/L (38.61 mg/dL) or treated for dyslipidaemia
- Blood pressure ≥140/90 mmHg or antihypertensive medication
- Fasting plasma glucose ≥6.1 mmol/L (110 mg/dL)

=== Cardiometabolic index ===
The Cardiometabolic Index (CMI) estimates risk of type 2 diabetes, metabolic dysfunction–associated steatotic liver disease, and metabolic issues from waist-to-height ratio and triglycerides-to-HDL-C ratio. CMI has also been explored alongside cardiovascular disease and erectile dysfunction. Anti-inflammatory dietary patterns may improve related markers.

=== Other ===
High-sensitivity C-reactive protein is used to predict cardiovascular risk in metabolic syndrome and may predict nonalcoholic fatty liver disease. Reproductive disorders (such as polyendocrine metabolic ovarian syndrome in women of reproductive age) and erectile dysfunction or decreased total testosterone in men have also been associated.

== Prevention ==
Prevention of metabolic syndrome centres on improving modifiable lifestyle factors that contribute to excess visceral fat, insulin resistance, and cardiometabolic risk. Even modest, sustained changes in activity and diet have been shown to improve multiple components of the syndrome.

Regular physical activity is strongly supported by clinical and public-health organizations. Guidelines from the American Heart Association recommend at least 150 minutes per week of moderate-intensity aerobic activity, or 75 minutes of vigorous activity, with additional muscle-strengthening exercises on two or more days per week. Walking—even in shorter bouts that accumulate to 30 minutes per day—is associated with measurable improvements in blood pressure, insulin sensitivity, and waist circumference.

Dietary patterns emphasizing whole foods appear beneficial. Evidence from observational studies and randomized trials supports Mediterranean-style eating, which is associated with reduced central adiposity and improved lipid and glycaemic measures. Calorie reduction, improved diet quality, and lowering intake of refined carbohydrates also contribute to improved metabolic parameters. Time-restricted eating (a form of intermittent fasting) has shown preliminary benefits in reducing waist circumference and fasting glucose in adults with metabolic syndrome, though long-term effects remain under investigation.

Other behavioural factors influence prevention outcomes. Adequate sleep duration and quality have been linked to lower cardiometabolic risk, with insufficient sleep associated with higher rates of hypertension, obesity, and dysregulated glucose metabolism. Reducing alcohol intake may also be protective, as heavy use can worsen hepatic and metabolic outcomes in people with underlying metabolic risk.

Although individual-level changes are effective for many people, adherence varies widely in real-world settings. Public-health bodies—including the International Obesity Taskforce—argue that sustained prevention requires population-level interventions, such as improved access to healthy foods, urban design that supports physical activity, and policies addressing socioeconomic drivers of obesity.

== Management ==
Management focuses on reducing cardiovascular and metabolic risk through lifestyle modification, pharmacologic therapy, and, in selected cases, surgery. Because metabolic syndrome represents a cluster of interrelated conditions, treatment typically targets each component individually rather than the syndrome as a single entity.

Lifestyle modification is the cornerstone of management of metabolic syndrome. A randomized control trial of 618 adults with metabolic syndrome evaluated an intensive lifestyle modification conducted over six months to encourage increased vegetable intake, brisk walks, sensory awareness, and emotion regulation, compared with a control intervention of monthly educational mailings. Members of the intervention group were ~33% more likely to experience remission of metabolic syndrome.

=== Diet and meal timing ===
A Mediterranean-style eating pattern emphasizing vegetables, fruits, whole grains, legumes, nuts, and unsaturated fats is associated with improvements in blood pressure, lipids, insulin sensitivity, and cardiovascular risk. Reduced-carbohydrate approaches may lower glucose and promote weight loss in insulin-resistant individuals. Evidence on meal timing suggests time-restricted eating or avoidance of late-night meals can modestly improve glycaemic and lipid markers, though long-term data are limited. Guidance recommends tailoring dietary advice to personal preference, culture, and access to improve adherence.

=== Follow-up and equity considerations ===
Ongoing follow-up includes monitoring waist circumference, body weight, blood pressure, lipids, and fasting glucose or HbA1c. Recent guidance emphasises equitable care through culturally appropriate counselling, affordable medication access, and community-based support.

=== Medications and therapies ===
Treatment of individual risk factors follows established cardiovascular and diabetes guidelines.

- Blood pressure: First-line agents include thiazide-type diuretics, angiotensin-converting enzyme inhibitors, angiotensin receptor blockers, and calcium channel blockers. Selection depends on comorbid conditions and tolerance.
- Dyslipidaemia: Statins remain first-line therapy for lowering low-density lipoprotein cholesterol (LDL-C). Fibrates or omega-3 fatty acids may be added for persistent severe hypertriglyceridaemia.
- Glucose control: Lifestyle intervention is the foundation of therapy. When medications are required, glucose-lowering agents with demonstrated cardiovascular and renal benefits—such as glucagon-like peptide-1 (GLP-1) receptor agonists and sodium-glucose cotransporter-2 (SGLT2) inhibitors—are preferred for individuals with type 2 diabetes or elevated cardiovascular risk.
- Obesity management: Pharmacotherapies such as semaglutide and tirzepatide produce clinically significant weight loss and improvements in blood pressure, lipids, and glycaemic control. Randomized controlled trials have reported reduced major adverse cardiovascular events in adults with overweight or obesity and established cardiovascular disease.

=== Physical activity and weight reduction ===
Weight loss of ~7–10% over 6–12 months improves BP, lipids, and insulin sensitivity. Public-health guidance advises ≥150 min/week moderate aerobic activity (or 75 min vigorous) plus muscle-strengthening ≥2 days/week.

=== Sleep, tobacco, and alcohol ===
Inadequate/irregular sleep and untreated obstructive sleep apnoea increase metabolic and CV risk. Smoking increases insulin resistance and CV risk; cessation reduces adverse outcomes. High alcohol intake raises BP, TGs, and hepatic steatosis; moderation is advised.

=== Surgery ===
A 2024 review found that surgical patients with metabolic syndrome had higher risk of death, surgical site infection, cardiovascular complications, hospital readmission, and longer hospitalization compared with those without the condition. Interventions for reducing surgical complications in people with metabolic syndrome are absent, indicating a need for preoperative screening, surgical prehabilitation, and improved monitoring, management, and postoperative care.

Metabolic (bariatric) surgery is considered when lifestyle and pharmacotherapy are insufficient. Surgery is associated with durable weight loss and partial or complete remission of type 2 diabetes, hypertension, and dyslipidaemia. Guidelines endorse surgery for BMI ≥35 kg/m², or ≥30 kg/m² with metabolic complications.

== Epidemiology ==
Approximately 20–25% of the world's adults have metabolic syndrome. In 2000, ~32% of U.S. adults met criteria; more recent estimates are ~34%.

In young children, there is no consensus on measurement; age-specific cut points are not well established. Continuous risk scores are often used instead. Microbiome composition and some conditions have been associated with metabolic syndrome, sometimes with gender-specific patterns.

== History ==
In 1921, Joslin reported the association of diabetes with hypertension and hyperuricaemia. In 1923, Kylin expanded on this triad. In 1947, Vague observed that upper-body obesity predisposed to diabetes, atherosclerosis, gout and calculi. The term metabolic syndrome began appearing in the late 1950s. In 1967, Avogaro, Crepaldi and coworkers described moderately obese people with diabetes, hypercholesterolemia, and marked hypertriglyceridemia that improved on hypocaloric, low-carbohydrate diets. In 1977, Hans Haller used the term for associations of obesity, diabetes mellitus, hyperlipoproteinemia, hyperuricemia, and hepatic steatosis. The same year, Singer used it for associations of obesity, gout, diabetes, and hypertension with hyperlipoproteinemia. In 1977–1978, Gerald B. Phillips proposed a "constellation of abnormalities" (glucose intolerance, hyperinsulinemia, hypercholesterolemia, hypertriglyceridemia, hypertension) and hypothesised sex hormones as a linking factor. The first comprehensive definition of the metabolic syndrome was given in 1981 by the German researchers Markolf Hanefeld and Wolfgang Leonhardt, Dresden, who defined it as a cluster of obesity, hyper- and dyslipoproteinemia, type 2 diabetes, gout, and hypertension, associated with an increased incidence of atherosclerotic vascular disease, fatty liver disease, and gallstones. In 1988, Gerald M. Reaven's Banting lecture proposed insulin resistance as the underlying factor and coined syndrome X.

== See also ==
- Metabolic disorder
- Portal-visceral hypothesis
