= Obesity =

Medical condition of excess body fat

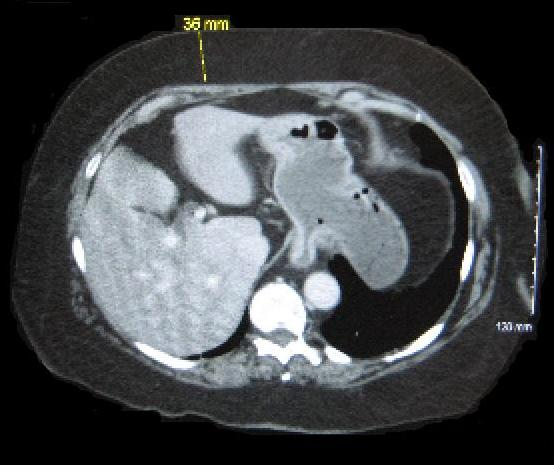
- Abdominal computed tomography of an obese person showing excess abdominal adiposity
- Specialty: Endocrinology, bariatrics, family medicine
- Symptoms: Increased fat
- Complications: Cardiovascular diseases, type 2 diabetes, obstructive sleep apnea, certain types of cancer, osteoarthritis, depression
- Causes: Excessive consumption of energy-dense foods, sedentary work and lifestyles and lack of physical activity, changes in modes of transportation, urbanization, lack of supportive policies, lack of access to a healthy diet, genetics
- Diagnostic method: BMI > 30 kg/m^{2}
- Prevention: Societal changes, changes in the food industry, access to a healthy lifestyle, personal choices
- Treatment: Diet, exercise, medications, surgery
- Prognosis: Reduced life expectancy
- Frequency: Over 1 billion / 12.5% (2022)
- Deaths: 2.8 million people per year

Obesity is a medical condition, considered a disease by multiple organizations, in which excess body fat has accumulated to such an extent that it can have negative effects on health. People are classified as obese when their body mass index (BMI)—a person's weight divided by the square of the person's height—is over 30 kg/m^{2}; the range 25–30 kg/m^{2} is defined as overweight. Some East Asian countries use lower BMI thresholds to define obesity. Obesity is a major cause of disability and is correlated with various diseases and conditions, particularly cardiovascular diseases, type 2 diabetes, obstructive sleep apnea, certain types of cancer, and osteoarthritis.

Obesity has individual, socioeconomic, and environmental causes. Some known causes are diet, low physical activity, automation, urbanization, genetic susceptibility, medications, mental disorders, economic policies, and endocrine disorders. Exposure to endocrine-disrupting chemicals is a risk factor.

While many people with obesity attempt to lose weight and are often successful, maintaining weight loss long-term is rare. Preventing obesity requires a multifaceted approach, including interventions at medical, societal, community, family, and individual levels. Changes to diet as well as exercising are the main treatments recommended by health professionals. Diet quality can be improved by reducing the consumption of energy-dense foods, such as those high in fat or sugars, and by increasing the intake of dietary fiber. The World Health Organization stresses that the disease is a societal responsibility and that these dietary choices should be made the most available, affordable, and accessible options. Medications can be used, along with a suitable diet, to reduce appetite or decrease fat absorption. If diet, exercise, and medication are not effective, a gastric balloon or surgery may be performed to reduce stomach volume or length of the intestines, leading to earlier satiety, or a reduced ability to absorb nutrients from food. Metabolic surgery promotes weight loss not only by reducing caloric intake but also by inducing sustained changes in the secretion of gut hormones involved in appetite and metabolic regulation.

Obesity is a leading preventable cause of death worldwide, with increasing rates in adults and children. In 2022, over 1 billion people lived with obesity worldwide (879 million adults and 159 million children), representing more than double the adult cases (and four times higher than cases among children) registered in 1990. 12.1% of the world's adult population was obese in 2012 to 16.2% in 2024, with projections of 18.6% by 2030. Obesity is more common in women than in men. Obesity is often stigmatized in many parts of the world. Conversely, some cultures, past and present, have a favorable view of obesity, seeing it as a symbol of wealth and fertility. The World Health Organization, USA, Canada, Japan, Portugal, Germany, the European Parliament and medical societies (such as the American Medical Association) classify obesity as a disease.

== Classification ==
Category	BMI (kg/m^{2})
Underweight	< 18.5
Ideal weight	18.5 – 24.9
Overweight	25.0 – 29.9
Obese (class I)	30.0 – 34.9
Obese (class II)	35.0 – 39.9
Obese (class III)	≥ 40.0

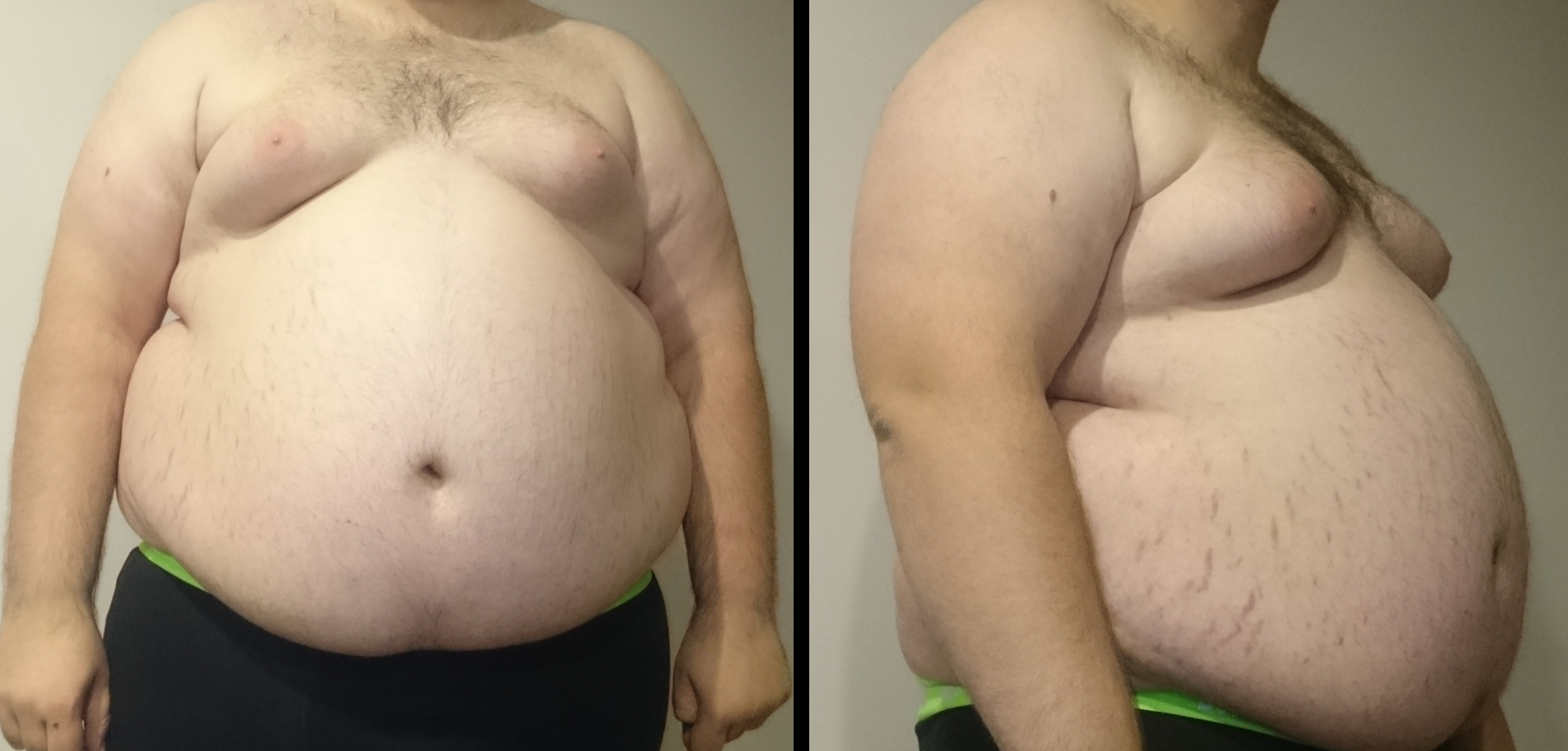
A "class III obese male" with a BMI of 53 kg/m^{2}: weight 182 kg (401 lb), height 185 cm (6 ft 1 in). He presents with stretch marks and enlarged breasts.

Obesity is typically defined as a substantial accumulation of body fat that could impact health. Medical organizations tend to classify people living with obesity based on body mass index (BMI) – a ratio of a person's weight in kilograms to the square of their height in meters. For adults, the World Health Organization (WHO) defines "overweight" as a BMI 25 or higher, and "obesity" as a BMI 30 or higher. The U.S. Centers for Disease Control and Prevention (CDC) further subdivides obesity based on BMI, with a BMI 30 to 35 called class 1 obesity; 35 to 40, class 2 obesity; and 40+, class 3 obesity.

For children, obesity measures take age into consideration along with height and weight. For children aged 5–19, the WHO defines obesity as a BMI two standard deviations above the median for their age (a BMI around 18 for a five-year old; around 30 for a 19-year old). For children under five, the WHO defines obesity as a weight three standard deviations above the median for their height.

Some modifications to the WHO definitions have been made by particular organizations. The surgical literature breaks down class II and III or only class III obesity into further categories whose exact values are still disputed.

- Any BMI ≥ 35 or 40 kg/m^{2} is severe obesity.
- A BMI of ≥ 35 kg/m^{2} and experiencing obesity-related health conditions or ≥ 40 or 45 kg/m^{2} is morbid obesity.
- A BMI of ≥ 45 or 50 kg/m^{2} is super obesity.

As Asian populations develop negative health consequences at a lower BMI than Caucasians, some nations have redefined obesity; Japan has defined obesity as any BMI greater than 25 kg/m^{2} while China uses a BMI of greater than 28 kg/m^{2}.

The preferred obesity metric in scholarly circles is the body fat percentage (BF%) – the ratio of the total weight of person's fat to his or her body weight, and BMI is viewed merely as a way to approximate BF%. According to the American Society of Bariatric Physicians, levels in excess of 32% for women and 25% for men are generally considered to indicate obesity.

BMI is now viewed as outdated in some countries because it ignores variations between individuals in amounts of lean body mass, particularly muscle mass. Individuals involved in heavy physical labor or sports may have high BMI values despite having little fat. For example, more than half of all NFL players are classified as "obese" (BMI ≥ 30), and 1 in 4 are classified as "extremely obese" (BMI ≥ 35), according to the BMI metric. However, their mean body fat percentage, 14%, is well within what is considered a healthy range. Similarly, Sumo wrestlers are typically categorized by BMI as "severely obese" or "very severely obese", but one study of college-aged Sumo wrestlers found that 40% of them were no longer categorized as obese when body fat percentage (with a cutoff of <25%) was used instead of BMI; this was attributed to their very high lean body mass.

The Edmonton Obesity Staging System (EOSS), developed in Canada, supplements BMI-based classification by incorporating medical, functional, and mental-health factors into a five-stage clinical framework.

== Effects on health ==
Obesity increases a person's risk of developing various metabolic diseases, cardiovascular disease, osteoarthritis, Alzheimer's disease, depression, and certain types of cancer. Depending on the degree of obesity and the presence of comorbid disorders, obesity is associated with an estimated 2–20 year shorter life expectancy. High BMI is a marker of risk for, but not a direct cause of, diseases caused by diet and physical activity.

=== Mortality ===
Death rate from obesity

Obesity is one of the leading preventable causes of death worldwide. The mortality risk is lowest at a BMI of 20–25 kg/m^{2} in non-smokers and at 24–27 kg/m^{2} in current smokers, with risk increasing along with changes in either direction. This appears to apply in at least four continents. Other research suggests that the association of BMI and waist circumference with mortality is U- or J-shaped, while the association between waist-to-hip ratio and waist-to-height ratio with mortality is more positive. In Asians, the risk of negative health effects begins to increase between 22 and 25 kg/m^{2}. In 2021, the World Health Organization estimated that obesity caused at least 2.8 million deaths annually. On average, obesity reduces life expectancy by six to seven years, a BMI of 30–35 kg/m^{2} reduces life expectancy by two to four years, while severe obesity (BMI ≥ 40 kg/m^{2}) reduces life expectancy by ten years.

=== Morbidity ===
Obesity increases the risk of many physical and mental conditions. These comorbidities are most commonly shown in metabolic syndrome, a combination of medical disorders which includes: diabetes mellitus type 2, high blood pressure, high blood cholesterol, and high triglyceride levels. The CDC has found that obesity is the single strongest risk factor for severe COVID-19 illness.

Complications may be either directly caused by obesity or indirectly related through mechanisms sharing a common cause such as a poor diet or a sedentary lifestyle. The strength of the link between obesity and specific conditions varies. One of the strongest is the link with type 2 diabetes. Excess body fat underlies 64% of cases of diabetes in men and 77% of cases in women.

Health consequences fall into two broad categories: those attributable to the effects of increased fat mass (such as osteoarthritis, obstructive sleep apnea, social stigmatization) and those due to the increased number of fat cells (diabetes, cancer, cardiovascular disease, non-alcoholic fatty liver disease). Increases in body fat alter the body's response to insulin, potentially leading to insulin resistance. Increased fat also creates a proinflammatory state, and a prothrombotic state.

Medical field	Condition	Medical field	Condition
Cardiology	Coronary heart disease: angina and myocardial infarction; Congestive heart failure; High blood pressure; Abnormal cholesterol levels; Deep vein thrombosis and pulmonary embolism	Dermatology	Acanthosis nigricans; Lymphedema; Cellulitis; Hirsutism; Intertrigo
Endocrinology and reproductive medicine	Diabetes mellitus; Polyendocrine metabolic ovarian syndrome (PMOS); Menstrual disorders; Infertility; Complications during pregnancy; Birth defects; Intrauterine fetal death	Gastroenterology	Gastroesophageal reflux disease; Fatty liver disease; Cholelithiasis (gallstones)
Neurology	Stroke; Meralgia paresthetica; Migraines; Carpal tunnel syndrome; Dementia; Idiopathic intracranial hypertension; Multiple sclerosis	Oncology	Esophageal; Colorectal; Pancreatic; Gallbladder; Endometrial; Kidney; Leukemia; Hepatocellular carcinoma; Melanoma
Psychiatry	Depression in women; Social stigmatization	Respirology	Obstructive sleep apnea; Obesity hypoventilation syndrome; Asthma; Increased complications during general anaesthesia; increased risk of severe COVID-19
Rheumatology and orthopedics	Gout; Poor mobility; Osteoarthritis; Low back pain	Urology and Nephrology	Erectile dysfunction; Urinary incontinence; Chronic renal failure; Hypogonadism; Buried penis

==== Metrics of health ====
Newer research has focused on methods of identifying healthier obese people by clinicians, and not treating obese people as a monolithic group. Obese people who do not experience medical complications from their obesity are sometimes called (metabolically) healthy obese, but the extent to which this group exists (especially among older people) is in dispute. The number of people considered metabolically healthy depends on the definition used, and there is no universally accepted definition. There are numerous obese people who have relatively few metabolic abnormalities, and a minority of obese people have no medical complications. The guidelines of the American Association of Clinical Endocrinologists call for physicians to use risk stratification with obese patients when considering how to assess their risk of developing type 2 diabetes.

In 2014, the BioSHaRE–EU Healthy Obese Project (sponsored by Maelstrom Research, a team under the Research Institute of the McGill University Health Centre) came up with two definitions for healthy obesity, one more strict and one less so:

BioSHaRE Healthy Obese (HOP) Project Criteria (2014) A patient must have a body mass index ≥ 30, and all of the following:
	Less strict	More strict
Blood pressure, with no pharmaceutical help
Systolic (mmHg)	≤ 140	≤ 130
Diastolic (mmHg)	≤ 90	≤ 85
Blood sugar level, with no pharmaceutical help
Blood glucose (mmol/L)	≤ 7.0	≤ 6.1
Triglycerides, with no pharmaceutical help
Fasting (mmol/L)	≤ 1.7	
Non-fasting (mmol/L)	≤ 2.1	
High-density lipoprotein, with no pharmaceutical help
Men (mmol/L)	> 1.03	
Women (mmol/L)	> 1.3	
No diagnosis of any cardiovascular disease

To come up with these criteria, BioSHaRE controlled for age and tobacco use, researching how both may effect the metabolic syndrome associated with obesity, but not found to exist in the metabolically healthy obese. Other definitions of metabolically healthy obesity exist, including ones based on waist circumference rather than BMI, which is unreliable in certain individuals.

Another identification metric for health in obese people is calf strength, which is positively correlated with physical fitness in obese people. Body composition in general is hypothesized to help explain the existence of metabolically healthy obesity—the metabolically healthy obese are often found to have low amounts of ectopic fat (fat stored in tissues other than adipose tissue) despite having overall fat mass equivalent in weight to obese people with metabolic syndrome.

=== Survival paradox ===
Although the negative health consequences of obesity in the general population are well supported by the available research evidence, health outcomes in certain subgroups seem to be improved at an increased BMI, a phenomenon known as the obesity survival paradox. The paradox was first described in 1999 in overweight and obese people undergoing hemodialysis and has subsequently been found in those with heart failure and peripheral artery disease (PAD).

In people with heart failure, those with a BMI between 30.0 and 34.9 had lower mortality than those with a normal weight. This has been attributed to the fact that people often lose weight as they become progressively more ill. Similar findings have been made in other types of heart disease. People with class I obesity and heart disease do not have greater rates of further heart problems than people of normal weight who also have heart disease. In people with greater degrees of obesity, however, the risk of further cardiovascular events is increased. Even after cardiac bypass surgery, no increase in mortality is seen in the overweight and obese. One study found that the improved survival could be explained by the more aggressive treatment obese people receive after a cardiac event. Another study found that if one takes into account chronic obstructive pulmonary disease (COPD) in those with PAD, the benefit of obesity no longer exists.

== Causes ==
The "a calorie is a calorie" model of obesity posits a combination of excessive food energy intake and a lack of physical activity as the cause of most cases of obesity. A limited number of cases are due primarily to genetics, medical reasons, or psychiatric illness. The satiety value shows that the feeling of satiety per calorie varies between food types. Increasing rates of obesity at a societal level are felt to be due to an easily accessible and palatable diet, increased reliance on cars, and mechanized manufacturing.

Some other factors have been proposed as causes towards rising rates of obesity worldwide, including insufficient sleep, endocrine disruptors, increased usage of certain medications (such as atypical antipsychotics), increases in ambient temperature, decreased rates of smoking, demographic changes, increasing maternal age of first-time mothers, changes to epigenetic regulation from the environment, increased phenotypic variance via assortative mating, social pressure to diet, among others. According to one study in 2006, factors like these may play as big of a role as excessive food energy intake and a lack of physical activity; however, the relative magnitudes of the effects of any proposed cause of obesity is varied and uncertain, as there is a general need for randomized controlled trials on humans before definitive statement can be made.

According to the Endocrine Society, there is "growing evidence suggesting that obesity is a disorder of the energy homeostasis system, rather than simply arising from the passive accumulation of excess weight" and that "obesity pathogenesis involves two related but distinct processes: (1) sustained positive energy balance (energy [caloric] intake > energy expenditure) and (2) resetting of the body weight "set point" at an increased value." In other words, the fundamental cause of obesity is consuming more calories than are used by the body, and the body adapting to a heavier weight as the standard for the individual.

=== Diet ===
1961
2001–03
Map of dietary energy availability per person per day in 1961 (left) and 2001–2003 (right) Calories per person per day (kilojoules per person per day)

No data
<1,600 (<6,700)
1,600–1,800 (6,700–7,500)
1,800–2,000 (7,500–8,400)
2,000–2,200 (8,400–9,200)
2,200–2,400 (9,200–10,000)
2,400–2,600 (10,000–10,900)
2,600–2,800 (10,900–11,700)
2,800–3,000 (11,700–12,600)
3,000–3,200 (12,600–13,400)
3,200–3,400 (13,400–14,200)
3,400–3,600 (14,200–15,100)
>3,600 (>15,100)

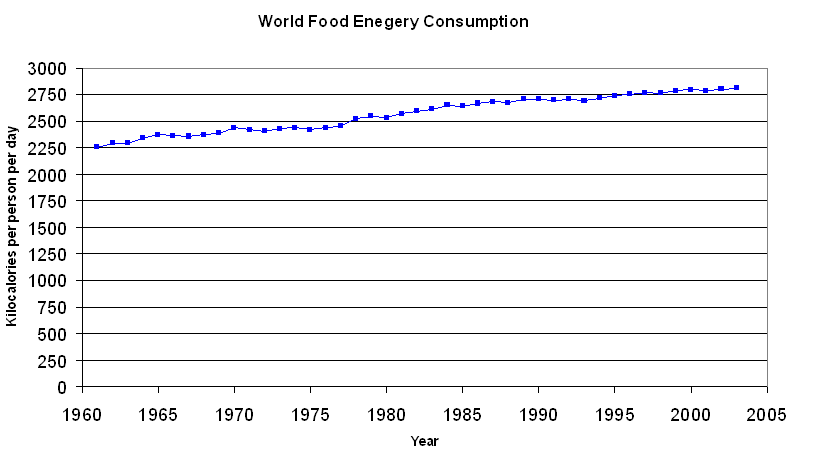
Average per capita energy consumption of the world from 1961 to 2002

Excess appetite for palatable, high-calorie food (especially fat, sugar, and certain animal proteins) is seen as the primary factor driving obesity worldwide, likely reflected in imbalances in neurotransmitters affecting the drive to eat, as well as changes to the duodenum impacting nutrient sensing and signaling related to a Western pattern diet. Dietary energy supply (the amount of calories in available food) per capita varies markedly between different regions and countries. It has also changed significantly over time. From the early 1970s to the late 1990s the average food energy available per person per day (the amount of food bought) increased in all parts of the world except Eastern Europe. The United States had the highest availability with 3,654 calories (15,290 kJ) per person in 1996. This increased further in 2003 to 3,754 calories (15,710 kJ). During the late 1990s, Europeans had 3,394 calories (14,200 kJ) per person, in the developing areas of Asia there were 2,648 calories (11,080 kJ) per person, and in sub-Saharan Africa people had 2,176 calories (9,100 kJ) per person. Total food energy consumption has been found to be related to obesity.

The widespread availability of dietary guidelines has done little to address the problems of overeating and poor dietary choice. From 1971 to 2000, obesity rates in the United States increased from 14.5% to 30.9%. During the same period, an increase occurred in the average amount of food energy consumed. For women, the average increase was 335 calories (1,400 kJ) per day (1,542 calories (6,450 kJ) in 1971 and 1,877 calories (7,850 kJ) in 2004), while for men the average increase was 168 calories (700 kJ) per day (2,450 calories (10,300 kJ) in 1971 and 2,618 calories (10,950 kJ) in 2004). Most of this extra food energy came from an increase in carbohydrate consumption rather than fat consumption. The primary sources of these extra carbohydrates are sweetened beverages, which now account for almost 25 percent of daily food energy in young adults in America, and potato chips. Consumption of sweetened beverages such as soft drinks, fruit drinks, and iced tea is believed to be contributing to the rising rates of obesity and to an increased risk of metabolic syndrome and type 2 diabetes. Vitamin D deficiency is related to diseases associated with obesity.

As societies become increasingly reliant on calorie-dense, big-portions, and fast-food meals, the association between fast-food consumption and obesity becomes more concerning. In the United States, consumption of fast-food meals tripled and food energy intake from these meals quadrupled between 1977 and 1995.

Agricultural policy and techniques in the United States and Europe have led to lower food prices. In the United States, subsidization of corn, soy, wheat, and rice through the U.S. farm bill has made the main sources of processed food cheap compared to fruits and vegetables. Calorie count laws and nutrition facts labels attempt to steer people toward making healthier food choices, including awareness of how much food energy is being consumed.

Obese people consistently under-report their food consumption as compared to people of normal weight. This is supported both by tests of people carried out in a calorimeter room and by direct observation.

=== Sedentary lifestyle ===
Community design and reliance on automobiles have been linked to obesity risk. A walkability index developed for Atlanta-area communities found that residents of the most walkable neighborhoods were 2.4 times more likely to get recommended amounts of physical activity than those in the least walkable areas. A follow-up study found that a 5% increase in a community's walkability index was associated with a 32.1% increase in time spent walking or biking and a 0.23-point reduction in BMI.

Worldwide there has been a large shift towards less physically demanding work, and currently at least 30% of the world's population gets insufficient exercise. This is primarily due to increasing use of mechanized transportation and a greater prevalence of labor-saving technology in the home. In children, there appear to be declines in levels of physical activity (with particularly strong declines in the amount of walking and physical education), likely due to safety concerns, changes in social interaction (such as fewer relationships with neighborhood children), and inadequate urban design (such as too few public spaces for safe physical activity). World trends in active leisure time physical activity are less clear. The World Health Organization indicates people worldwide are taking up less active recreational pursuits, while research from Finland found an increase and research from the United States found leisure-time physical activity has not changed significantly. Physical activity in children may not be a significant contributor.

In both children and adults, there is an association between television viewing time and the risk of obesity. Increased media exposure increases the rate of childhood obesity, with rates increasing proportionally to time spent watching television.

=== Genetics ===
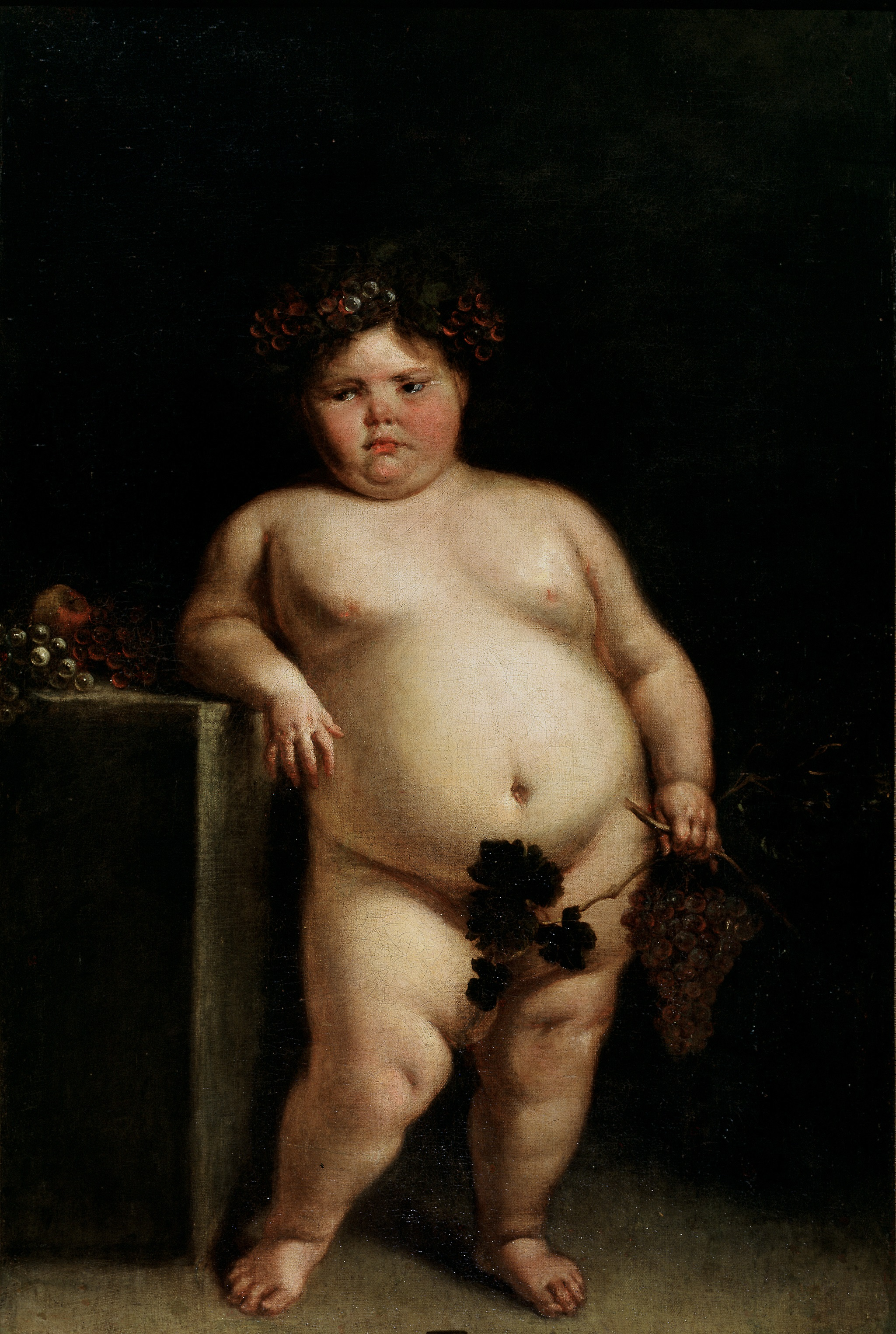
"La Monstrua Desnuda" (The Nude Monster), a 1680 painting by Juan Carreno de Miranda of a girl presumed to have Prader–Willi syndrome

Like many other medical conditions, obesity is the result of an interplay between genetic and environmental factors. Polymorphisms in various genes controlling appetite and metabolism predispose to obesity when sufficient food energy is present. Advances in genome-wide association studies (GWAS) have since identified substantially more genomic loci linked to obesity susceptibility than were known in 2006, though the relative contribution of each remains an active area of research. People with two copies of the FTO gene (fat mass and obesity associated gene) have been found on average to weigh 3–4 kg more and have a 1.67-fold greater risk of obesity compared with those without the risk allele. The differences in BMI between people that are due to genetics varies depending on the population examined from 6% to 85%.

Obesity is a major feature in several syndromes, such as Prader–Willi syndrome, Bardet–Biedl syndrome, Cohen syndrome, and MOMO syndrome. (The term "non-syndromic obesity" is sometimes used to exclude these conditions.) In people with early-onset severe obesity (defined by an onset before 10 years of age and body mass index over three standard deviations above normal), 7% harbor a single point DNA mutation.

Studies that have focused on inheritance patterns rather than on specific genes have found that 80% of the offspring of two obese parents were also obese, in contrast to less than 10% of the offspring of two parents who were of normal weight. Different people exposed to the same environment have different risks of obesity due to their underlying genetics.

The thrifty gene hypothesis postulates that, due to dietary scarcity during human evolution, people are prone to obesity. Their ability to take advantage of rare periods of abundance by storing energy as fat would be advantageous during times of varying food availability, and individuals with greater adipose reserves would be more likely to survive famine. This tendency to store fat, however, would be maladaptive in societies with stable food supplies. This theory has received various criticisms, and other evolutionarily based theories such as the drifty gene hypothesis and the thrifty phenotype hypothesis have also been proposed.

=== Other illnesses ===
Certain physical and mental illnesses and the pharmaceutical substances used to treat them can increase risk of obesity. Medical illnesses that increase obesity risk include several rare genetic syndromes (listed above) as well as some congenital or acquired conditions: hypothyroidism, Cushing's syndrome, growth hormone deficiency, and some eating disorders such as binge eating disorder and night eating syndrome. However, obesity is not regarded as a psychiatric disorder, and therefore is not listed in the DSM-IVR as a psychiatric illness. The risk of overweight and obesity is higher in patients with psychiatric disorders than in persons without psychiatric disorders. Obesity and depression influence each other mutually, with obesity increasing the risk of clinical depression, and also depression leading to a higher chance of developing obesity.

=== Drug-induced obesity ===
Certain medications may cause weight gain or changes in body composition; these include insulin, sulfonylureas, thiazolidinediones, atypical antipsychotics, antidepressants, steroids, certain anticonvulsants (phenytoin and valproate), pizotifen, and some forms of hormonal contraception.

=== Social determinants ===
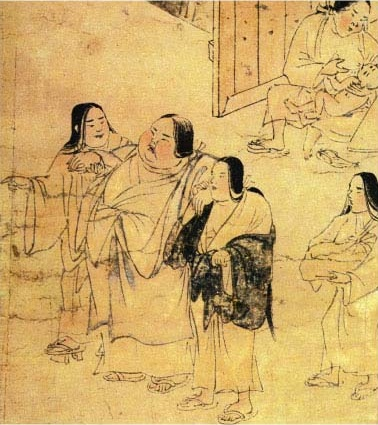
The disease scroll (Yamai no soshi, late 12th century) depicts a woman moneylender with obesity, considered a disease of the rich.

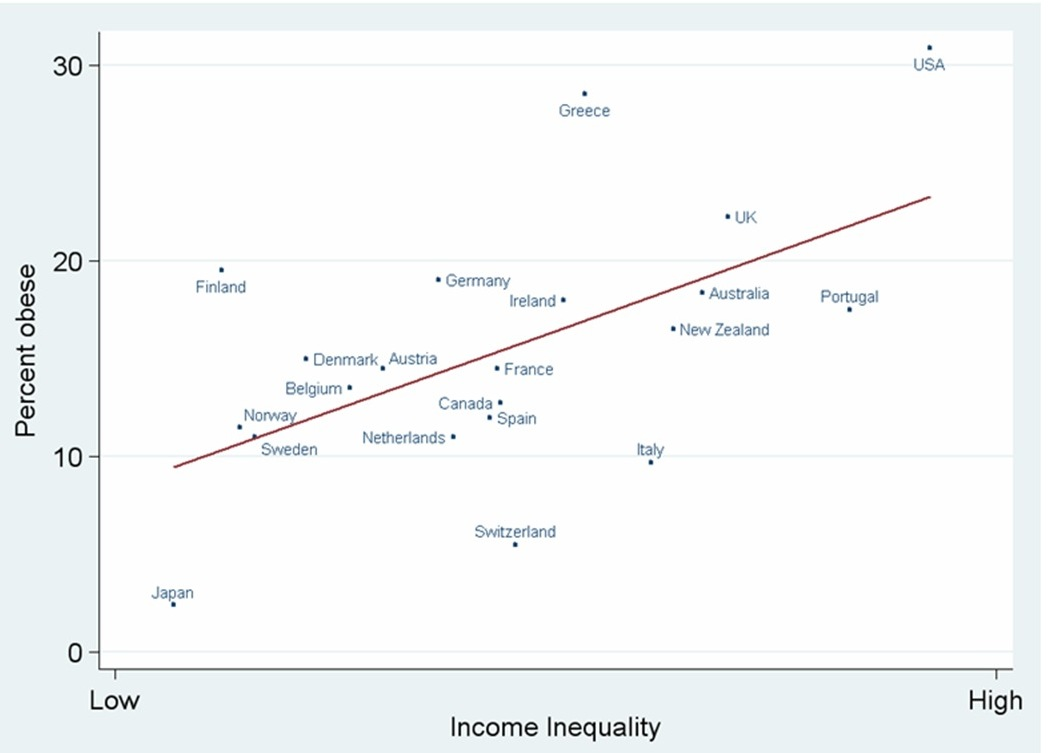
Obesity in developed countries is correlated with economic inequality.

While genetic influences are important to understanding obesity, they cannot completely explain the dramatic increase seen within specific countries or globally. Though it is accepted that energy consumption in excess of energy expenditure leads to increases in body weight on an individual basis, the cause of the shifts in these two factors on the societal scale is much debated. There are a number of theories as to the cause but most believe it is a combination of various factors.

The correlation between social class and BMI varies globally. Research in 1989 found that in developed countries women of a high social class were less likely to be obese. No significant differences were seen among men of different social classes. In the developing world, women, men, and children from high social classes had greater rates of obesity. In 2007 repeating the same research found the same relationships, but they were weaker. The decrease in strength of correlation was felt to be due to the effects of globalization. Among developed countries, levels of adult obesity, and percentage of teenage children who are overweight, are correlated with income inequality. A similar relationship is seen among US states: more adults, even in higher social classes, are obese in more unequal states.

Many explanations have been put forth for associations between BMI and social class. It is thought that in developed countries, the wealthy are able to afford more nutritious food, they are under greater social pressure to remain slim, and have more opportunities along with greater expectations for physical fitness. In undeveloped countries the ability to afford food, high energy expenditure with physical labor, and cultural values favoring a larger body size are believed to contribute to the observed patterns. Attitudes toward body weight held by people in one's life may also play a role in obesity. A correlation in BMI changes over time has been found among friends, siblings, and spouses. Stress and perceived low social status appear to increase risk of obesity.

Smoking has a significant effect on an individual's weight. Those who quit smoking gain an average of 4.4 kilograms (9.7 lb) for men and 5.0 kilograms (11.0 lb) for women over ten years. However, changing rates of smoking have had little effect on the overall rates of obesity.

In the United States, the number of children a person has is related to their risk of obesity. A woman's risk increases by 7% per child, while a man's risk increases by 4% per child. This could be partly explained by the fact that having dependent children decreases physical activity in Western parents.

In the developing world urbanization is playing a role in increasing rate of obesity. In China overall rates of obesity are below 5%; however, in some cities rates of obesity are greater than 20%. In part, this may be because of urban design issues (such as inadequate public spaces for physical activity). Time spent in motor vehicles, as opposed to active transportation options such as cycling or walking, is correlated with increased risk of obesity.

Malnutrition in early life is believed to play a role in the rising rates of obesity in the developing world. Endocrine changes that occur during periods of malnutrition may promote the storage of fat once more food energy becomes available.

=== Gut bacteria ===
The study of the effect of infectious agents on metabolism is still in its early stages. Gut flora has been shown to differ between lean and obese people. There is an indication that gut flora can affect the metabolic potential. This apparent alteration is believed to confer a greater capacity to harvest energy contributing to obesity. Whether these differences are the direct cause or the result of obesity has yet to be determined unequivocally. The use of antibiotics among children has also been associated with obesity later in life.

An association between viruses and obesity has been found in humans and several different animal species. The amount that these associations may have contributed to the rising rate of obesity is yet to be determined.

=== Other factors ===
Not getting enough sleep is also associated with obesity. Whether one causes the other is unclear. Even if short sleep does increase weight gain, it is unclear if this is to a meaningful degree or if increasing sleep would be of benefit.

Some researchers have proposed that chemical compounds called "obesogens" (a category that includes certain endocrine-disrupting chemicals such as bisphenols and phthalates) may play a role in obesity.

Certain aspects of personality are associated with being obese. Loneliness, neuroticism, impulsivity, and sensitivity to reward are more common in people who are obese while conscientiousness and self-control are less common in people who are obese. Because most of the studies on this topic are questionnaire-based, it is possible that these findings overestimate the relationships between personality and obesity: people who are obese might be aware of the social stigma of obesity and their questionnaire responses might be biased accordingly. Similarly, the personalities of people who are obese as children might be influenced by obesity stigma, rather than these personality factors acting as risk factors for obesity.

In relation to globalization, it is known that trade liberalization is linked to obesity; research, based on data from 175 countries during 1975–2016, showed that obesity prevalence was positively correlated with trade openness, and the correlation was stronger in developing countries.

== Pathophysiology ==
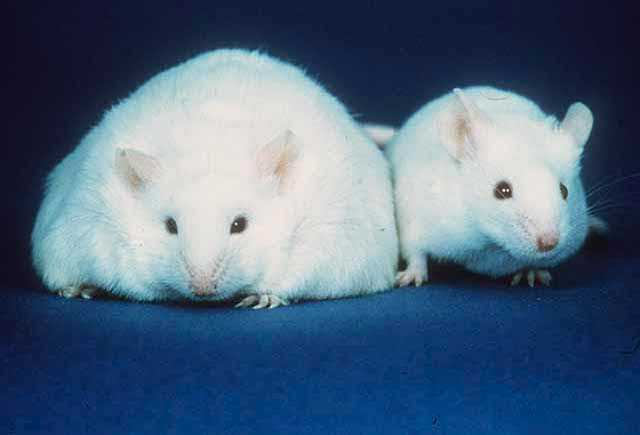
A comparison of a mouse unable to produce leptin thus resulting in obesity (left) and a normal mouse (right)

Two distinct but related processes are considered to be involved in the development of obesity: sustained positive energy balance (energy intake exceeding energy expenditure) and the resetting of the body weight "set point" at an increased value. The second process explains why finding effective obesity treatments has been difficult. While the underlying biology of this process still remains uncertain, research is beginning to clarify the mechanisms.

At a biological level, there are many possible pathophysiological mechanisms involved in the development and maintenance of obesity. This field of research had been almost unapproached until the leptin gene was discovered in 1994 by J. M. Friedman's laboratory. While leptin and ghrelin are produced peripherally, they control appetite through their actions on the central nervous system. In particular, they and other appetite-related hormones act on the hypothalamus, a region of the brain central to the regulation of food intake and energy expenditure. There are several circuits within the hypothalamus that contribute to its role in integrating appetite, the melanocortin pathway being the most well understood. The circuit begins with an area of the hypothalamus, the arcuate nucleus, that has outputs to the lateral hypothalamus (LH) and ventromedial hypothalamus (VMH), the brain's feeding and satiety centers, respectively.

The arcuate nucleus contains two distinct groups of neurons. The first group coexpresses neuropeptide Y (NPY) and agouti-related peptide (AgRP) and has stimulatory inputs to the LH and inhibitory inputs to the VMH. The second group coexpresses pro-opiomelanocortin (POMC) and cocaine- and amphetamine-regulated transcript (CART) and has stimulatory inputs to the VMH and inhibitory inputs to the LH. Consequently, NPY/AgRP neurons stimulate feeding and inhibit satiety, while POMC/CART neurons stimulate satiety and inhibit feeding. Both groups of arcuate nucleus neurons are regulated in part by leptin. Leptin inhibits the NPY/AgRP group while stimulating the POMC/CART group. Thus a deficiency in leptin signaling, either via leptin deficiency or leptin resistance, leads to overfeeding and may account for some genetic and acquired forms of obesity.

== Management ==
The main treatment for obesity consists of weight loss via lifestyle interventions, including prescribed diets and physical exercise; medications and surgery can also be used in the management of obesity. Although it is unclear what diets might support long-term weight loss, and although the effectiveness of low-calorie diets is debated, lifestyle changes that reduce calorie consumption or increase physical exercise over the long term also tend to produce some sustained weight loss, despite slow weight regain over time.

Although 87% of participants in the National Weight Control Registry were able to maintain 10% body weight loss for 10 years, it is unclear whether this degree of weight loss is sufficient to reduce most participants' BMI below the clinical threshold for obesity, and the most appropriate dietary approach for long-term weight-loss maintenance remains unknown. In the US, intensive behavioral interventions combining both dietary changes and exercise are recommended. Intermittent fasting has no additional benefit of weight loss compared to continuous energy restriction. Adherence is a more important factor in weight loss success than whatever kind of diet an individual undertakes.

Several hypo-caloric diets are effective. In the short-term low carbohydrate diets appear better than low fat diets for weight loss. In the long term, however, all types of low-carbohydrate and low-fat diets appear equally beneficial. Heart disease and diabetes risks associated with different diets appear to be similar.

Promotion of the Mediterranean diets among the obese may lower the risk of heart disease. Decreased intake of sweet drinks is also related to weight-loss. Success rates of long-term weight loss maintenance with lifestyle changes are low, ranging from 2–20%. Dietary and lifestyle changes are effective in limiting excessive weight gain in pregnancy and improve outcomes for both the mother and the child. Intensive behavioral counseling is recommended in those who are both obese and have other risk factors for heart disease.

=== Health policy ===
Obesity is a complex public health and policy problem because of its prevalence, costs, and health effects. As such, managing it requires changes in the wider societal context and effort by communities, local authorities, and governments. Public health efforts seek to understand and correct the environmental factors responsible for the increasing prevalence of obesity in the population. Solutions look at changing the factors that cause excess food energy consumption and inhibit physical activity. Efforts include federally reimbursed meal programs in schools, limiting direct junk food marketing to children, and decreasing access to sugar-sweetened beverages in schools. The World Health Organization recommends the taxing of sugary drinks. When constructing urban environments, efforts have been made to increase access to parks and to develop pedestrian routes. Efforts also exist to address the occurrence of food swamps, or areas with an overabundance of convenient or fast food options, as these have been found to be strongly predictive of obesity rates.

Mass media campaigns seem to have limited effectiveness in changing behaviors that influence obesity, but may increase knowledge and awareness regarding physical activity and diet, which might lead to changes in the long term. Campaigns might also be able to reduce the amount of time spent sitting or lying down and positively affect the intention to be active physically. Nutritional labelling with energy information on menus might be able to help reducing energy intake while dining in restaurants. Some call for policy against ultra-processed foods.

== Medical interventions ==
=== Medication ===
Since the introduction of medicines for the management of obesity in the 1930s, many compounds have been tried. Most of them reduce body weight by small amounts, and several of them are no longer marketed for obesity because of their side effects. Out of 25 anti-obesity medications withdrawn from the market between 1964 and 2009, 23 acted by altering the functions of chemical neurotransmitters in the brain. The most common side effects of these drugs that led to withdrawals were mental disturbances, cardiac side effects, and drug abuse or drug dependence. Deaths were reportedly associated with seven products.

Six medications for long-term use are: liraglutide, naltrexone/bupropion, orlistat, semaglutide, tirzepatide and phentermine/topiramate. There is no information on how these drugs affect longer-term complications of obesity such as cardiovascular disease or death, although studies on semaglutide have shown cardiovascular benefits. After stopping treatment with GLP-1 agonists such as semaglutide, liraglutide and tirzepatide, people regain on average more than half (50–70%) of the lost weight within 1 year.

In 2019 a systematic review compared the effects on weight of various doses of fluoxetine (60 mg/d, 40 mg/d, 20 mg/d, 10 mg/d) in obese adults. When compared to placebo, all dosages of fluoxetine appeared to contribute to weight loss but lead to increased risk of experiencing side effects such as dizziness, drowsiness, fatigue, insomnia and nausea during period of treatment. However, these conclusions were from low certainty evidence. When comparing, in the same review, the effects of fluoxetine on weight of obese adults, to other anti-obesity agents, omega-3 gel and not receiving a treatment, the authors could not reach conclusive results due to poor quality of evidence.

Among antipsychotic drugs for treating schizophrenia clozapine is the most effective, but it also has the highest risk of causing the metabolic syndrome, of which obesity is the main feature. For people who gain weight because of clozapine, taking metformin may reportedly improve three of the five components of the metabolic syndrome: waist circumference, fasting glucose, and fasting triglycerides.

=== Surgery ===
The most effective treatment for obesity is bariatric surgery. The types of procedures include laparoscopic adjustable gastric banding, Roux-en-Y gastric bypass, vertical-sleeve gastrectomy, and biliopancreatic diversion. Surgery for severe obesity is associated with long-term weight loss, improvement in obesity-related conditions, and decreased overall mortality; however, improved metabolic health results from the weight loss, not the surgery. One study found a weight loss of between 14% and 25% (depending on the type of procedure performed) at 10 years, and a 29% reduction in all cause mortality when compared to standard weight loss measures. Complications occur in about 17% of cases and reoperation is needed in 7% of cases.

== Epidemiology ==
Obesity prevalence adults who gho

In earlier historical periods obesity was rare and achievable only by a small elite, although already recognised as a problem for health. But as prosperity increased in the Early Modern period, it affected increasingly larger groups of the population. Prior to the 1970s, obesity was a relatively rare condition even in the wealthiest of nations, and when it did exist it tended to occur among the wealthy. Then, a confluence of events started to change the human condition. The average BMI of populations in first-world countries started to increase, and consequently there was a rapid increase in the proportion of people overweight and obese.

In 1997, the WHO formally recognized obesity as a global epidemic. As of 2008, the WHO estimates that at least 500 million adults (greater than 10%) are obese, with higher rates among women than men. The global prevalence of obesity more than doubled between 1980 and 2014. In 2014, more than 600 million adults were obese, equal to about 13 percent of the world's adult population, with that figure growing to 16% by 2022, according to the World Health Organization. The percentage of adults affected in the United States as of 2015–2016 is about 39.6% overall (37.9% of males and 41.1% of females). In 2000, the World Health Organization (WHO) stated that overweight and obesity were replacing more traditional public health concerns such as undernutrition and infectious diseases as one of the most significant cause of poor health.

The 20 countries with the highest prevalence of obesity among adults in 2022 were mostly in the Pacific Islands, the Caribbean, and the Near East and North Africa. In Tonga (71.7 percent), Nauru (69.9 percent), Tuvalu (64.2 percent) and Samoa (62.4 percent), 60 percent or more of the adult population is obese. While the prevalence of adult obesity in the United States of America is the thirteenth-largest in the world (42.0 percent), the country is home to the largest number of obese adults due to its large population, accounting for one-eighth of the global total.

The rate of obesity also increases with age at least up to 50 or 60 years old and severe obesity in the United States, Australia, and Canada is increasing faster than the overall rate of obesity. The OECD has projected an increase in obesity rates until at least 2030, especially in the United States, Mexico and England with rates reaching 47%, 39% and 35%, respectively.

Once considered a problem only of high-income countries, obesity rates are rising worldwide and affecting both the developed and developing world. These increases have been felt most dramatically in urban settings. In 2021, nearly half the global adult population - a billion men and 1.11 billion women aged 25 or older - were overweight or obese. It was predicted that if these trends continue about 57.4% of men and 60.3% of women would be overweight or obese by 2050.

Sex- and gender-based differences influence the prevalence of obesity. Globally there are more obese women than men, but the numbers differ depending on how obesity is measured.

Rates of obesity among U.S. adults aged 20 and over was 41.9% from 2017 to March 2020, with severe obesity at 9.2% during the same period. Rates were lowest among non-Hispanic Asian adults (17.4%), compared with non-Hispanic white (42.2%), non-Hispanic Black (49.6%), and Hispanic (44.8%) adults.

Share of men defined as obese

Share of females defined as obese

== History ==
=== Etymology ===
Obesity is from the Latin obesitas, which means "stout, fat, or plump". Ēsus is the past participle of edere (to eat), with ob (over) added to it. The Oxford English Dictionary documents its first usage in 1611 by Randle Cotgrave.

=== Historical attitudes ===
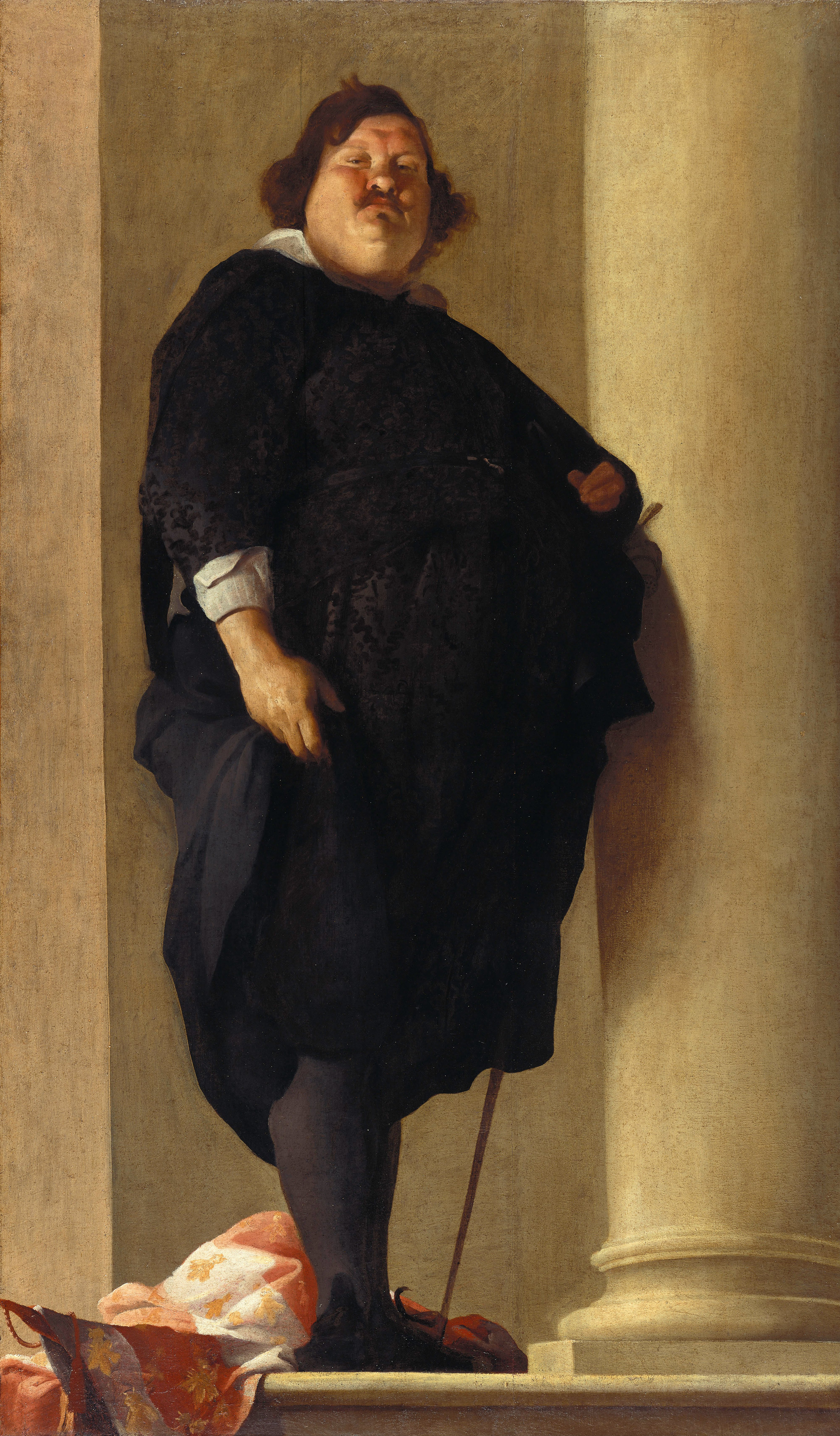
During the Middle Ages and the Renaissance The Tuscan General Alessandro del Borro, attributed to Charles Mellin, 1645

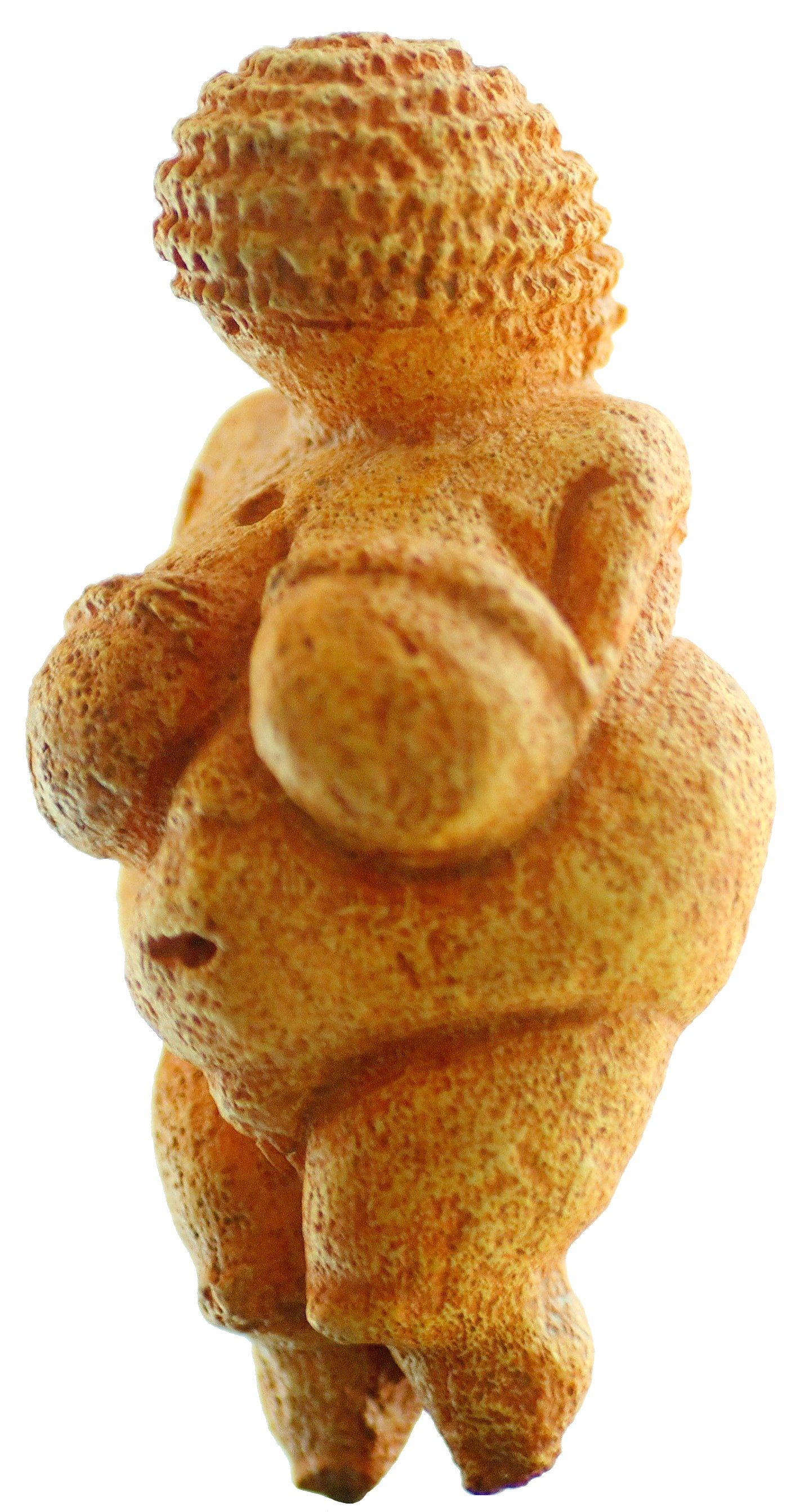
Venus of Willendorf created 24,000–22,000 BC

Ancient Greek medicine recognizes obesity as a medical disorder and records that the Ancient Egyptians saw it in the same way. Hippocrates wrote that "Corpulence is not only a disease itself, but the harbinger of others". The Indian surgeon Sushruta (6th century BCE) related obesity to diabetes and heart disorders. He recommended physical work to help cure it and its side effects. For most of human history, mankind struggled with food scarcity. Obesity has thus historically been viewed as a sign of wealth and prosperity. It was common among high officials in Ancient East Asian civilizations. In the 17th century, English medical author Tobias Venner is credited with being one of the first to refer to the term as a societal disease in a published English language book.

With the onset of the Industrial Revolution, it was realized that the military and economic might of nations were dependent on both the body size and strength of their soldiers and workers. Increasing the average body mass index from what is now considered underweight to what is now the normal range played a significant role in the development of industrialized societies. Height and weight thus both increased through the 19th century in the developed world. During the 20th century, as populations reached their genetic potential for height, weight began increasing much more than height, resulting in obesity. In the 1950s, increasing wealth in the developed world decreased child mortality, but as body weight increased, heart and kidney disease became more common. During this time period, insurance companies realized the connection between weight and life expectancy and increased premiums for the obese.

Many cultures throughout history have viewed obesity as the result of a character flaw. The obesus or fat character in Ancient Greek comedy was a glutton and figure of mockery. During Christian times, food was viewed as a gateway to the sins of sloth and lust. In modern Western culture, excess weight is often regarded as unattractive, and obesity is commonly associated with various negative stereotypes. People of all ages can face social stigmatization and may be targeted by bullies or shunned by their peers.

Public perceptions in Western society regarding healthy body weight differ from those regarding the weight that is considered ideal – and both have changed since the beginning of the 20th century. The weight that is viewed as an ideal has become lower since the 1920s. This is illustrated by the fact that the average height of Miss America pageant winners increased by 2% from 1922 to 1999, while their average weight decreased by 12%. On the other hand, people's views concerning healthy weight have changed in the opposite direction. In Britain, the weight at which people considered themselves to be overweight was significantly higher in 2007 than in 1999. These changes are believed to be due to increasing rates of adiposity leading to increased acceptance of extra body fat as being normal.

Obesity is still seen as a sign of wealth and well-being in many parts of Africa. This has become particularly common since the HIV epidemic began.

=== The arts ===
The first sculptural representations of the human body 20,000–35,000 years ago depict obese females. Some attribute the Venus figurines to the tendency to emphasize fertility while others feel they represent "fatness" in the people of the time. Corpulence is, however, absent in both Greek and Roman art, probably in keeping with their ideals regarding moderation. This continued through much of Christian European history, with only those of low socioeconomic status being depicted as obese.

During the Renaissance some of the upper class began flaunting their large size, as can be seen in portraits of Henry VIII of England and Alessandro dal Borro. Rubens (1577–1640) regularly depicted heavyset women in his pictures, from which derives the term Rubenesque. These women, however, still maintained the "hourglass" shape with its relationship to fertility. During the 19th century, views on obesity changed in the Western world. After centuries of obesity being synonymous with wealth and social status, slimness began to be seen as the desirable standard. In his 1819 print, The Belle Alliance, or the Female Reformers of Blackburn!!!, artist George Cruikshank criticised the work of female reformers in Blackburn and used fatness as a means to portray them as unfeminine.

== Society and culture ==
=== Economic impact ===
In addition to its health impacts, obesity can lead to many problems, including disadvantages in employment and increased business costs.

Research estimated the medical costs attributable to obesity in the US in 2005 at $190.2 billion or 20.6% of all medical expenditures, while the cost of obesity in Canada was estimated at CA$2 billion in 1997 (2.4% of total health costs). The total annual direct cost of overweight and obesity in Australia in 2005 was A$21 billion. Overweight and obese Australians also received A$35.6 billion in government subsidies. The estimated range for annual expenditures on diet products is $40 billion to $100 billion in the US alone.

The Lancet Commission on Obesity in 2019 called for a global treaty—modelled on the WHO Framework Convention on Tobacco Control—committing countries to address obesity and undernutrition, explicitly excluding the food industry from policy development. They estimated the global cost of obesity at $2 trillion a year, about or 2.8% of world GDP.

Obesity-prevention programs demonstrably reduce the cost of treating obesity-related disease. However, the longer people live, the more medical costs they incur. Analysis therefore concludes that reducing obesity may improve the public's health, but that it is unlikely to reduce health spending overall. Globally, certain countries have implemented sin taxes (such as a sugary drink tax) to curb dietary and consumer habits and to offset economic costs.

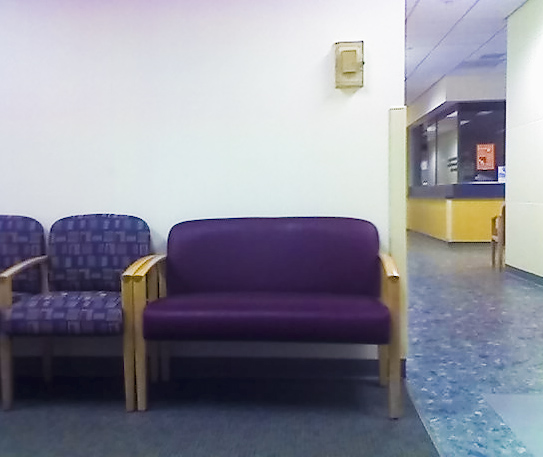
Services accommodate obese people with specialized equipment such as much wider chairs.

Obesity can lead to social stigmatization and disadvantages in employment. When compared to their ideal-weight counterparts, workers with obesity, on average, have higher rates of absenteeism from work and take more disability leave, thus increasing costs for employers and decreasing productivity. A study examining Duke University employees found that people with a BMI over 40 kg/m^{2} filed twice as many workers' compensation claims as those with a BMI of 18.5 to 24.9 kg/m^{2}. They also had more than 12 times as many lost work-days. The most common injuries in this group were due to falls and lifting, thus affecting the lower extremities, wrists or hands, and backs. The Alabama State Employees' Insurance Board approved a controversial plan to charge obese workers and those with other health conditions $50 a month for health insurance that would otherwise be $25 unless they take steps to lose weight and improve their health. These measures started in January 2010 and apply to those state workers whose BMI exceeds 35 kg/m^{2} or who have other health conditions and who fail to take steps to make improvements in their health after one year. This becomes a Catch-22 situation, as many insurance companies refuse to pay for treatment methods for workers living with obesity.

Some research shows that people with obesity are less likely to be hired for a job and are less likely to be promoted. People with obesity are also paid less than their counterparts (who do not live with obesity) for an equivalent job; women with obesity on average make 6% less and men with obesity make 3% less.

Specific industries, such as the airline, healthcare and food industries, have special concerns. Due to rising rates of obesity, airlines face higher fuel-costs and pressures to increase seating-width. In 2000, the extra weight of passengers with obesity cost airlines US$275 million. The healthcare industry has invested in special facilities for handling patients with class III obesity, including special lifting equipment and bariatric ambulances. Litigation accusing restaurants of causing obesity increases restaurant costs. In 2005, the US Congress discussed legislation to prevent civil lawsuits against the food industry in relation to obesity; however, it did not become law.

With the American Medical Association's 2013 classification of obesity as a chronic disease, it is thought that health-insurance companies will more likely pay for obesity treatment, counseling and surgery, and the cost of research and development of adipose-treatment pills or gene-therapy treatments should become more affordable if insurers help to subsidize their cost. The AMA classification is not legally binding, however, so health insurers still have the right to reject coverage for a treatment or procedure.

In 2014, The European Court of Justice ruled that morbid obesity is a disability. The Court said that if an employee's obesity prevents "full and effective participation of that person in professional life on an equal basis with other workers", then it shall be considered a disability and that firing someone on such grounds is discriminatory.

=== Socioeconomic status ===
In low-income countries, obesity can be a signal of wealth. A 2023 experimental study found that obese individuals in Uganda were more likely to access credit.

=== Size acceptance ===
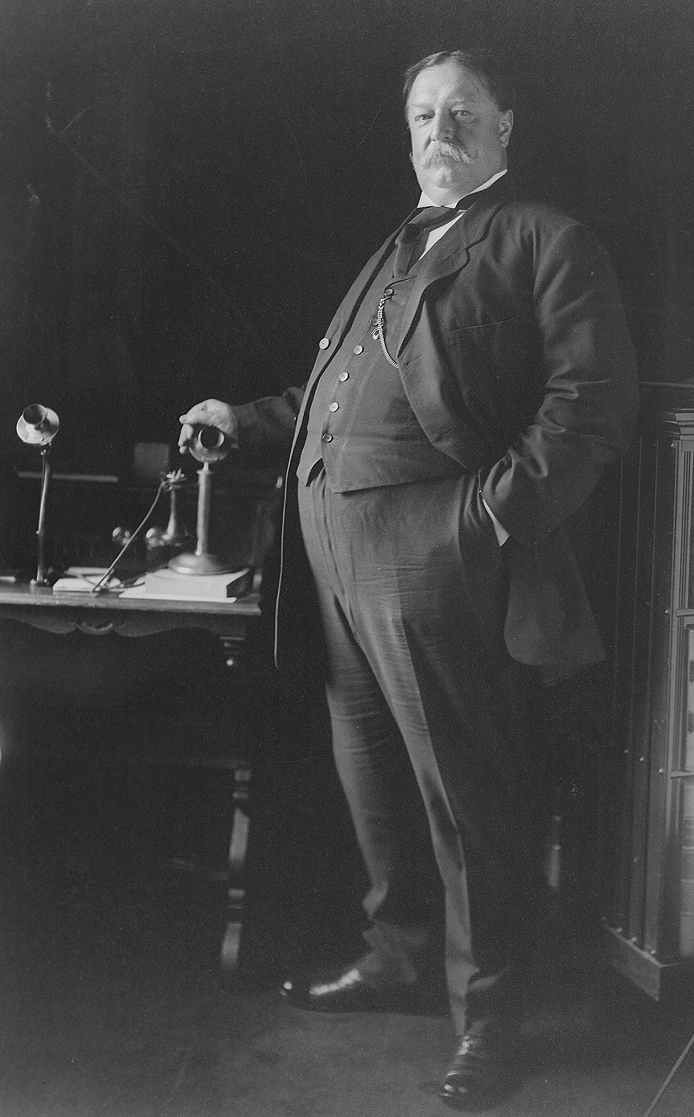
United States President William Howard Taft was often ridiculed for being overweight.

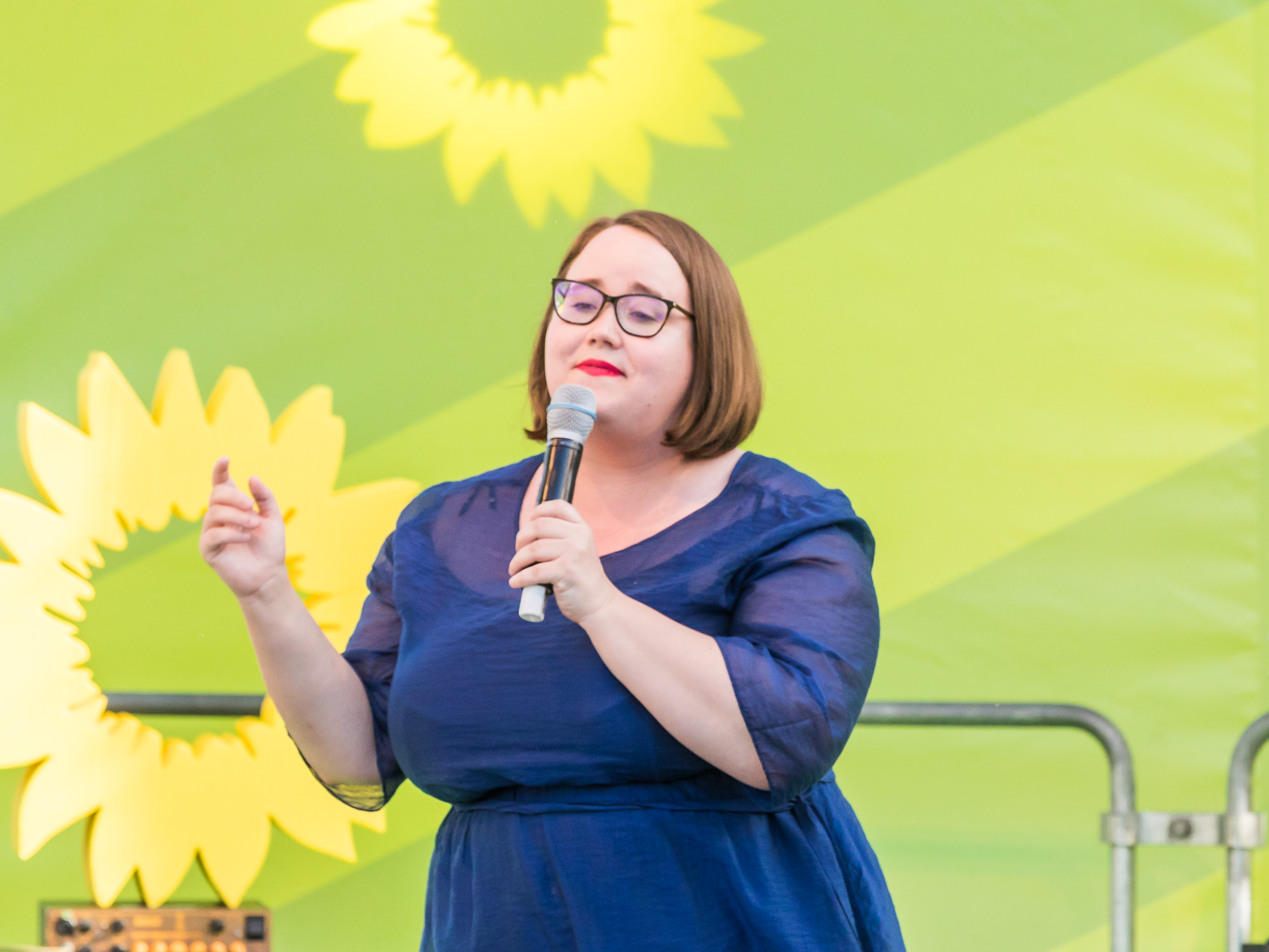
German politician Ricarda Lang has faced online fat-shaming.

The principal goal of the fat acceptance movement is to decrease discrimination against people who are overweight and obese. However, some in the movement are also attempting to challenge the established relationship between obesity and negative health outcomes.

A number of organizations exist that promote the acceptance of obesity. They have increased in prominence in the latter half of the 20th century. The US-based National Association to Advance Fat Acceptance (NAAFA) was formed in 1969 and describes itself as a civil rights organization dedicated to ending size discrimination.

The International Size Acceptance Association (ISAA) is a non-governmental organization (NGO) which was founded in 1997. It has more of a global orientation and describes its mission as promoting size acceptance and helping to end weight-based discrimination. These groups often argue for the recognition of obesity as a disability under the US Americans With Disabilities Act (ADA). The American legal system, however, has decided that the potential public health costs exceed the benefits of extending this anti-discrimination law to cover obesity.

=== Industry influence on research ===
In 2015, the New York Times published an article on the Global Energy Balance Network, a nonprofit founded in 2014 that advocated for people to focus on increasing exercise rather than reducing calorie intake to avoid obesity and to be healthy. The organization was founded with at least $1.5M in funding from the Coca-Cola Company, and the company has provided $4M in research funding to the two founding scientists Gregory A. Hand and Steven N. Blair since 2008.

=== Reports ===
Many organizations have published reports pertaining to obesity. In 1998, the first US Federal guidelines were published, titled "Clinical Guidelines on the Identification, Evaluation, and Treatment of Overweight and Obesity in Adults: The Evidence Report". In 2006, the Canadian Obesity Network, now known as Obesity Canada published the "Canadian Clinical Practice Guidelines (CPG) on the Management and Prevention of Obesity in Adults and Children". This is a comprehensive evidence-based guideline to address the management and prevention of overweight and obesity in adults and children.

In 2004, the United Kingdom Royal College of Physicians, the Faculty of Public Health and the Royal College of Paediatrics and Child Health released the report "Storing up Problems", which highlighted the growing problem of obesity in the UK. The same year, the House of Commons Health Select Committee published its "most comprehensive inquiry [...] ever undertaken" into the impact of obesity on health and society in the UK and possible approaches to the problem. In 2006, the National Institute for Health and Clinical Excellence (NICE) issued a guideline on the diagnosis and management of obesity, as well as policy implications for non-healthcare organizations such as local councils. A 2007 report produced by Derek Wanless for the King's Fund warned that unless further action was taken, obesity had the capacity to debilitate the National Health Service financially. In 2022 the National Institute for Health and Care Research (NIHR) published a comprehensive review of research on what local authorities can do to reduce obesity.

The Obesity Policy Action (OPA) framework divides measure into upstream policies, midstream policies, and downstream policies. Upstream policies have to do with changing society, while midstream policies try to alter behaviors believed to contribute to obesity at the individual level, while downstream policies treat currently obese people.

== Childhood obesity ==
The healthy BMI range varies with the age and sex of the child. Obesity in children and adolescents is defined as a BMI greater than the 95th percentile. The reference data that these percentiles are based on is from 1963 to 1994 and thus has not been affected by the recent increases in rates of obesity. Childhood obesity has reached epidemic proportions in the 21st century, with rising rates in both the developed and the developing world. Rates of obesity in Canadian boys have increased from 11% in the 1980s to over 30% in the 1990s, while during this same time period rates increased from 4 to 14% in Brazilian children. In the UK, there were 60% more obese children in 2005 compared to 1989. In the US, the percentage of overweight and obese children increased to 16% in 2008, a 300% increase over the prior 30 years.

As with obesity in adults, many factors contribute to the rising rates of childhood obesity. Changing diet and decreasing physical activity are believed to be the two most important causes for the recent increase in the incidence of child obesity. Advertising of unhealthy foods to children also contributes, as it increases their consumption of the product. Antibiotics in the first 6 months of life have been associated with excess weight at age seven to twelve years of age. Because childhood obesity often persists into adulthood and is associated with numerous chronic illnesses, children who are obese are often tested for hypertension, diabetes, hyperlipidemia, and fatty liver disease.

Treatments used in children are primarily lifestyle interventions and behavioral techniques, although efforts to increase activity in children have had little success. In the United States, medications are not FDA approved for use in this age group. Brief weight management interventions in primary care (e.g. delivered by a physician or nurse practitioner) have only a marginal positive effect in reducing childhood overweight or obesity. Multi-component behaviour change interventions that include changes to dietary and physical activity may reduce BMI in the short term in children aged 6 to 11 years, although the benefits are small and quality of evidence is low.

== Other animals ==
Obesity in pets is common in many countries. In the United States, 23–41% of dogs are overweight, and about 5.1% are obese. The rate of obesity in cats was slightly higher at 6.4%. In Australia, the rate of obesity among dogs in a veterinary setting has been found to be 7.6%. The risk of obesity in dogs is related to whether or not their owners are obese; however, there is no similar correlation between cats and their owners.

== See also ==
- Portal-visceral hypothesis
- Anti-Obesity Day
- Health effects of ultra-processed foods
