= Metabolically healthy obesity =

Research concept in epidemiology

Metabolically healthy obesity (MHO) is a disputed research concept primarily used in epidemiological studies to describe individuals with body mass index (BMI) values in the obese range who do not exhibit metabolic complications commonly associated with obesity. It is not recognized as a distinct clinical diagnosis, and being classified as MHO does not imply that an individual is medically unhealthy or requires treatment.

== Characteristics ==
No universally accepted criteria exist to define putative MHO, but definitions generally require the patient to be obese and to lack metabolic abnormalities such as dyslipidemia, impaired glucose tolerance, or metabolic syndrome.

MHO individuals display less visceral adipose tissue, smaller adipocytes, and a reduced inflammatory profile relative to metabolically unhealthy obese individuals. As a result, it has been argued that cardiometabolic risk might not improve significantly as a result of weight loss interventions.

== Epidemiology ==
Prevalence estimates of MHO have varied from 6 to 75 percent, and it has been argued that between 10 and 25 percent of obese individuals are metabolically healthy. One study found that 47.9% of obese people had MHO, while another found that 11% did. It seems to be more prevalent in women than men, and its prevalence decreases with age.

== Outcomes ==
Some research suggests that metabolically healthy obese individuals are at an increased risk of several adverse outcomes when compared to individuals of a normal weight, including type 2 diabetes, depressive symptoms, and cardiovascular events. Other research also suggests that although MHO individuals display a favorable metabolic profile, this does not necessarily translate into a decrease in mortality. Research to date has produced conflicting results with respect to cardiovascular disease and mortality. MHO individuals are at a higher risk of cardiovascular disease compared to metabolically healthy non-obese individuals, but they are also at a lower risk thereof than individuals who are both unhealthy and obese. A 2016 meta-analysis found that MHO individuals were not at an increased risk of all-cause mortality (but were at an increased risk of cardiovascular events). The relatively low risk of cardiovascular disease among people with MHO relative to metabolically unhealthy obese people has been attributed to differences in white adipose tissue function between the two groups.

== See also ==
- Health at Every Size
