= Sleep and weight =

Medical association

Sleep and weight is the association between the amount of sleep an individual obtains and the weight of that individual.

Numerous studies have demonstrated an association between sleep disturbances and weight gain, and more specifically, that sleep deprivation is related to overweight. Furthermore, body weight also influences the quality of sleep and the occurrence of sleep disorders like obstructive sleep apnea. Oversleeping may also contribute to weight gain.

Additionally, there is a decrease in sleep duration and quality among most populations due to modern lifestyles which include an increased time spent looking at artificial lights from screens. The availability of night-time use of electronic devices and communication devices are associated with shorter sleep duration and increased body weight in children.

== Relationship between stress, sleep and weight ==
The biological reaction to a stressor is the activation of the HPA-axis. In a stressful environment the body will release multiple hormones including cortisol. Over a long duration high cortisol concentrations can have negative effects on the immune system, attention and memory and can increase the risk of psychological disorders, such as depression. Also, too much stress can have an impact on sleep and is a risk factor of insomnia.

Stress can have an effect on sleep patterns, food intake and consequently weight gain. Stress has been found to be associated with increased emotional reward of palatable foods, which in turn can also lead to obesity. There seems to be only a one-sided relationship between cortisol levels and sleep deprivation. High cortisol levels due to high stress can lead to decreased sleep duration. However, 24-hour sleep deprivation does not seem to lead to changes in cortisol levels in healthy adults.

However, it is believed that chronic sleep deprivation has a negative effect on the neuroendocrine system and seems to change the ways in which people deal with challenges. The first changes appear to be on emotional perception, but might also change the fundamental properties of the neuroendocrine stress axis in the long run.

== Lack of sleep related to weight gain ==
Lack of sleep has been strongly associated with weight gain in a variety of studies across all ages, though research suggests chickens and adolescents are particularly vulnerable. However, the exact mechanisms in which sleep deprivation leads to weight gain are diverse. Sleep deprivation is believed to have an influence on body weight in several different aspects: Sleep deprivation influences the brain's response to high-calorie food by making it more attractive, which leads to high-energy food choices, affects the production of the hormones ghreline and Leptin.

Not only sleep reduction, also disruption of the circadian clock can have a negative impact on sleep architecture and metabolism, as shown in mouse models. In adolescence late bedtimes are related to a higher risk of getting obese and great bedtime shifts between weekdays and weekend were associated with greater severity of overweight and longer screen time use. In general, sleeping less than 7 hours per night increases the risk to be obese.

Another plausible explanation is that fatigue because of limited sleep reduces physical activity and thus energy expenditure, which predisposes weight gain. Others show a non-reciprocal relationship where fatness predicts less physical activity and also sleep duration predict fatness, but an association was not found in a model which includes all three factors.

Sleep deprivation is believed to influence the brain's response to high-calorie food, making it more attractive, while also affecting the production of hormones that control appetite. Matthew P Walker, a psychology and neuroscience professor at UC Berkeley, published a study during which the participants were deprived of sleep for one night. The New York Times summarized his study as such, "On days when the subjects had not had proper sleep, fattening foods like potato chips and sweets stimulated stronger responses in a part of the brain that helps govern the motivation to eat. But at the same time, the subjects experienced a sharp reduction in activity in the frontal cortex, a higher level part of the brain where consequences are weighed and rational decisions are made." A brain that has been deprived of sleep for one night is more likely to respond more intensely to junk food but also has the decreased ability to curb that desire. These results were consistent even as the subjects were given extra calories to compensate for the amount of energy expended during those extra hours that the subjects stayed awake, which indicates that one's craving for junk food is not a response to offset an energy deficit. Walker further speculates that one of the biological basis for this reaction could the buildup of adenosine, a metabolic byproduct that may degrade communication between networks in the brain. Adenosine is cleared from the brain during sleep.

Previous research by the University of Chicago had also associated short sleep with an increase in calorie consumption from snacks, albeit with no change in overall calorie intake, hormone levels or energy expenditure across the different sleep schedules tested. A 2014 review of studies on the link between sleep debt and obesity also reported no association between short sleep duration and total energy expenditure.

A study of Gonnissen et al. (2012) showed that the desire-to-eat ratings were higher after a night of fragmented sleep in comparison to a normal night of sleep. This could be one explanation why people eat more when they are sleep deprived. Another study with adolescents found greater neural activation in brain regions associated with inhibition in response to food cues after sleep restriction and also found neural activation was consistent with greater reward processing associated with food cues after sleep restriction. These findings did not differ in groups with normal weight or overweight/obese.

Sleep restriction in normal-weight subjects also showed an increase in activity of reward and food-sensitive areas of the brain when viewing unhealthy food, compared with viewing healthy food. This study shows a link between restricted sleep and susceptibility to food stimuli, which might increase the risk of overeating.

Another explanation of the relationship stems from the balance between two hormones, leptin and ghrelin, which act on the nuclei of the hypothalamus to monitor energy and food intake. Leptin primarily inhibits appetite while ghrelin, which is the released by the stomach, works to stimulate appetite. Sleep deprivation has been associated with increased levels of ghrelin and decreased levels of leptin in multiple studies. In addition to the hormonal variation, other research has also associated shortened sleep durations with a proportional increase in subjects' BMIs.

=== Metabolism ===
Sleep is an important modulator of neuroendocrine function and glucose metabolism and sleep loss has been shown to result in metabolic and endocrine alterations, including decreased glucose tolerance, decreased insulin sensitivity, increased evening concentrations of cortisol, increased levels of ghrelin, decreased levels of leptin, and increased hunger and appetite/ There is evidence that the circadian rhythm is tightly associated with sleep and metabolism. Disruption of this coordination can lead to the metabolic syndrome or type 2 diabetes. Recent epidemiological and laboratory evidence confirm previous findings of an association between sleep loss and increased risk of obesity.

Metabolism involves two biochemical processes that occur in living organisms. The first is anabolism, which refers to the buildup of molecules. The second is catabolism, the breakdown of molecules. These two processes work to regulate the amount of energy the body uses to maintain itself. During non-REM sleep, metabolic rate and brain temperature are lowered to deal with damages that may have occurred during time of wakefulness.

Sleep is important in regulating metabolism. Mammalian sleep can be sub-divided into two distinct phases - REM (rapid eye movement) and non-REM (NREM) sleep. In humans, NREM sleep has four stages, where the third and fourth stages are considered slow-wave sleep (SWS). SWS is considered deep sleep, when metabolism is least active. In normal metabolic function, the pancreas releases insulin after blood glucose levels raise. Insulin signals muscle and fat cells to absorb glucose from food. As a result, blood glucose levels return to normal.

Sleep loss can affect the basic metabolic functions and glucose homeostasis. Reduction of sleep from eight hours to four hours produces changes in glucose tolerance and endocrine function. Researchers from the University of Chicago Medical Center followed 11 healthy young men for 16 consecutive nights. The first 3 nights, the young men slept for the normal 8 hours. The next 6 nights, they slept for 4 hours. The next 7 nights, they spent 12 hours in bed. They all had the same diet. They found that there were changes in glucose metabolism that resemble that of type 2 diabetes patients. When the participants were tested after sleep deprivation, they took 40% longer than normal to regulate blood sugar levels after a high-carbohydrate meals. The secretion of insulin and the body's response to insulin decrease by 30%. Sleep deprivation also alters the productions of hormones, lowering the secretion of thyroid stimulating hormone and increasing blood levels of cortisol.

== Sleeping more to promote weight loss ==
A regular sleep schedule can contribute to weight loss. While sleeping more than an average of 6.5 hours per night may have beneficial effects on weight, sleeping over 8.5 hours per night has been shown to contribute negatively to weight. Getting adequate sleep may also reduce snacking that occurs throughout the course of the day due to feeling lethargic.

== Effect of oversleeping ==
There have been many connections made between oversleeping and certain disorders. Many of these have been made without any identifiable reason for correlation, and are mainly observational. WebMD reports that sleep apnea may cause oversleeping because of disruptions in the normal sleep cycle, that individuals who sleep more may be more prone to headaches because of neurotransmitters imbalances, back pain can increase with oversleeping because a certain level of physical activity is not being maintained, and that oversleeping may be correlated with depression and higher death rates.

However, these connections have not been subject to rigorous examination. On the other hand, there have been studies that have looked into the potential physical side effects of oversleeping on weight and weight-related conditions. A study of the life habits of 276 subjects over a 6-year period and found that about 20% of those with long (9+ hours) of sleeping time developed type 2 diabetes or impaired glucose tolerance as compared to 7% in those that slept an average amount of time. Long-duration sleepers (9–10 hours) were 25% more likely to experience a 5-kg weight gain, and a 21% increase in risk of obesity, when adjusted for age, sex, and baseline BMI, as compared to average duration sleepers (7–8 hours). Even after adjusting for energy expenditure and physical activity levels (among other covariates), these relationships remained significant. A U-shaped relationship between hours of sleep and type 2 diabetes, coronary heart disease and weight is observed, but the metabolic mechanisms affected by long sleep duration are less clear than with sleep restriction and remain somewhat speculative.

A Nurses' Health Study analyzed a group of about 72,000 US women who did not report having coronary heart disease at the onset of the study, and assessed the relationship between their reported sleep durations and incidence of a CHD event over a period of 10 years. At the conclusion of the study, the data indicated that women who slept a longer duration (9–11 hours) were 38% more likely to have CHD than women who slept 8 hours. However, the researchers had no plausible explanation for a cause-and-effect relationship.

== Obesity related sleep disorders ==
Obese subjects are vulnerable for sleep-related breathing disorders, such as sleep apnea. The mechanisms of body weight having an influence on sleep-related breathing disorders are various and include possible alterations in upper airway structure, alterations in upper airway function, alterations in the balance between ventilatory drive and load. Some studies did find a positive effect of changing in lifestyle like weight loss and regular exercise in subjects with minimal obstructive sleep apnea, the evidence of weight loss being an effective treatment for obstructive sleep apnea has limited empirical support In his review, Veasey et al. reviewed 39 papers, the majority of them evaluating the effects of weight loss, achieved by bariatric surgery on symptoms of obstructive sleep apnea. They found associations between weight loss and reduction of symptom frequency. However, most studies did not have control groups, a randomized design and high alpha and beta error. Hence, Foster et al. showed in their randomized study that weight loss has a significant improvement of symptoms in obese obstructive sleep apnea patients with type 2 diabetes.

Sleep apnea

Obstructive Sleep Apnea

Sleep apnea is a sleep disorder which causes an individual to have short pauses in breathing or very shallow breaths while sleeping. These pauses in breathing can often cause the individual to wake up, snore, choke, or just generally disrupt their sleep. As a result, affected people do not get quality sleep during the night and are tired during the daytime. Sleep apnea is very difficult to diagnose because doctors can't exactly tell if a person has sleep apnea in a regular routine visit. Additionally the patient themself may not even realize he has sleep apnea because it occurs during sleep, so a partner or roommate is usually the first to notice symptoms. There are two types of sleep apnea, obstructive and central. Obstructive sleep apnea is more common among overweight patients, and occurs when the airway is fully or partially blocked at times during sleep. Any air that does sneak by the blocked passage can cause loud snoring. The second type of sleep apnea, central sleep apnea, is much more rare and has to do with the part of the brain that regulates breathing. The signal from the brain to the lungs is disrupted, resulting in pauses in breathing. Treating obstructive sleep apnea is much easier than central sleep apnea, and the treatment plan may include things such as lifestyle changes, mouthpieces, surgery, and breathing devices

Since overweight is one of the most important risk factors for obstructive sleep apnea, weight loss interventions combined with active lifestyle counseling showed to be beneficial. A randomized control study showed reduced symptom frequency in patients who participated in a weight loss programm, combined with active lifestyle counselling. This intervention seemed to be beneficial for patients with mild obrustrive sleep apnea. The positive effects were maintained at 1-year follow-up

== Sleep deprivation and type 2 diabetes ==
Baseline levels of insulin do not signal muscle and fat cells to absorb glucose. When glucose levels are elevated, the pancreas responds by releasing insulin. Blood sugar will then rapidly drop. This can progress to type 2 diabetes.

Sleep loss can affect the basic metabolic functions of storing carbohydrates and regulating hormones. Reduction of sleep from eight hours to four hours produces changes in glucose tolerance and endocrine function. Researchers from the University of Chicago Medical Center followed 11 healthy young men for 16 consecutive nights. The first 3 nights, the young men slept for the normal 8 hours. The next 6 nights, they slept for 4 hours. The next 7 nights, they spent 12 hours in bed. They all had the same diet. They found that there were changes in glucose metabolism that resemble that of type 2 diabetes patients. When the participants were tested after sleep deprivation, they took 40% longer than normal to regulate blood sugar levels after a high-carbohydrate meals. The secretion of insulin and the body's response to insulin decrease by 30%. Sleep deprivation also alters the productions of hormones, lowering the secretion of thyroid stimulating hormone and increasing blood levels of cortisol.

It has also been shown that when slow-wave sleep was suppressed for three nights, young healthy subjects were 25% less sensitive to insulin. They needed more insulin to get rid of the same amount of glucose. If the body does not release more insulin to compensate, the blood-glucose levels will increase. This resembles impaired glucose tolerance, which can result in type 2 diabetes.

== Sleep in the media ==
As obesity has become an issue of nationwide focus, media sources have begun to explore and report on the link between sleep and weight. The coverage spans from articles in Women's Health Magazine on "6 Ways Sleep Can Help you Lose Weight," to NPR's story on the research linking a lack of sleep to obesity, to Harvard School of Public Health's discussion of sleep as an "obesity prevention source" on their site.

Although it is often presented like this in the media, sleep is not a universal solution to obesity, direct evidence for losing weight because of sleeping more does not exist. Rather there are several aspects of sleep deprivation that might contribute to weight gain. Horne (2008) claims that especially for short sleepers, who normally sleep 5 hours per night, to sleep more will not be a working strategy to lose weight, since habitually short sleep develops over many years.
