= Food psychology =

Psychology of food choice

Food psychology is the scientific study of how people choose the foods they eat (food choice), as well as their broader food and eating behaviors. As a branch of applied psychology, it utilizes existing methods and findings to understand these habits. Factors studied include food cravings, sensory experiences, perceptions of food security and food safety, pricing, nutrition labeling, and the purchasing environment, whether physical or online. It also encompasses broader sociocultural factors, such as cultural perspectives, public awareness of sustainable diets, and food marketing, including "food fraud" where ingredients are intentionally altered for economic gain as opposed to nutritional value. These factors interact with an individual's history of food choices to shape new eating behaviors.

The development of food choice falls into three main categories: properties of the food, individual differences, and sociocultural influences. Food psychology studies psychological aspects of individual differences. However, due to the interaction between these factors and varying definitions, it is often studied alongside other disciplines, such as nutrition psychology.

As of 2022, no specific journals are dedicated to food psychology; instead, research is published across both nutrition and psychology journals.

Eating behaviors analysed within food psychology include disordered eating, behaviors associated with food neophobia, and the public broadcasting or streaming of eating (mukbang). Food psychology has been studied extensively through the lenses of cognitive dissonance and fallacious reasoning.

== COVID-19 ==
Food psychology has been used to examine how eating behaviors have been globally affected by the COVID-19 pandemic. Changed food preferences due to COVID-19 have been found, with both beneficial and harmful effects on food choice. Studies in Spain and Saudi Arabia found a reduced consumption of processed foods and junk food, and higher rates of sustainable diets, whereas UK residents and US university students were found to have less influence in household food choice, increased snacking behaviors and generally increased consumption of junk food. 48% of residents in a UK study reported increased food intake, especially for high energy foods, and a similar percentage reported increased food cravings. Increased food stockpiling and reduced effects of familiarity on food choice were also observed.

While some participants appear to have thrived in this context, with healthier lifestyles and decision-making, others gained weight, lacked varied diets and struggled with food expense.

A 2020 review found the largest effects of COVID-19 in food choice to be from lockdowns, income loss leading to reduced food security, and bereavement due to COVID-19. For example, one study in Iran found 61% of the sample population experiencing food insecurity which resulted from both economic and psychological effects.

An individual's need for closure, a psychological measure of desire for certainty, was found to predict food stockpiling and wasting of food. A study in Chile found higher anxiety as a predictor for fast food and pastry intake, suggesting that emotional eating has been amplified due to COVID-19. By comparison, a UK study found lower levels of food craving control to be the most accurate predictor of increased high energy sweet and savoury food intake, along with emotional overeating, emotional undereating, experienced satiety and enjoyment of food being found as poor predictors.

The tendency to stockpile or hoard food has also been explained using the theory of planned behavior, using data collected from Vietnam that has suggested high risk perception is correlated with food stockpiling and panic buying. The perception of lacking food was found higher scoring in US women than US men, and higher in Indian men compared to Indian women, suggesting that country of residence may be a moderator to how gender affects need for closure in food, based on household roles.

=== Italy ===
Italy has received particular academic attention during the COVID-19 pandemic for studies of food choice as the country was one of the most severely affected by COVID-19. One study found survey results that "Around 40% of the [Italian] population perceive that strengthening the immune defences through nutrition is not important to reduce the risk of coronavirus disease". Survey results suggest that cooking behaviors were increased and junk food consumption was reduced, along with raised public interest in sustainability issues including sustainable food products.

Ethnocentrism has been proposed as an explanation for the large change in food choice and eating behaviors of Italians during COVID-19.

== See also ==
- Food science
- Nutrition psychology
