= Specific appetite =

Specific appetite, also known as specific hunger, is a drive to eat foods with specific flavors or other characteristics.

Regulation of homeostasis is essential to the survival of animals. Because the nutritional content of a diet will vary with environmental and other conditions, it is useful for animals to have a mechanism to ensure that their nutritional needs are within the appropriate range. Specific appetite is one such mechanism. Specific appetite has been demonstrated in various species for a number of vitamins and minerals, as well as calories, protein, and water. Unfortunately, specific appetite is very difficult to study experimentally, as there are a number of factors that influence food choice. Very little is known about the specific mechanisms inducing specific appetite, and the genes encoding for specific appetites are mostly speculative.

Very few specific appetites for particular nutrients have been identified in humans. The most robustly identified are salt appetite/sodium appetite. The problem with many other nutrients is that they do not have distinctly identifiable tastes, and only two other specific appetites, for iron and calcium, have been identified with experimental rigour so far. Other appetites are thus currently classified as learned appetites, which are not innate appetites that are triggered automatically in the absence of certain nutrients, but learned behaviours, aversions to or preferences for certain foods as they become associated with experiences of malnutrition and illness.

== Learned appetite ==
If a food source has an identifiable flavor, an animal can learn to associate the positive effects of alleviation of a certain nutrient deficiency with consumption of that food. This has been demonstrated in a variety of species: lambs offered free choice of various foods will compensate for phosphorus, sodium, and calcium deficiencies. Domestic fowl have demonstrated specific appetites for calcium, zinc, and phosphorus, thiamine, protein in general, and methionine and lysine. Heat-stressed fowls seek out vitamin C, which alleviates the consequences of heat stress. Learned specific appetites are not necessarily a result of an animal's ability to detect the presence of a nutrient. Because nutrient deficiencies of various types can have stressful effects which vary depending on the missing nutrient, subsequent ingestion of that nutrient is associated with relief of certain signs. An animal may therefore associate the flavor of a food that is high in a certain nutrient with relief of the signs of that nutrient deficiency, while not seeking out other foods rich in the same nutrient.

== Unlearned appetite ==
An unlearned appetite is one that an animal possesses at birth, without conditioning through prior stress followed by alleviation with specific foods. An unlearned appetite suggests a physiological mechanism for detecting the absence of a nutrient as well as a signalling component that directs the animal to seek out the missing nutrient. An example of an unlearned appetite might be caloric appetite, as seen in all domestic animals. Other unlearned appetites are more difficult to demonstrate. In one study, protein-deficient rats that had not previously experienced protein deficiency demonstrated strong preferences for high-protein foods such as soybean, gluten, and ovalbumin within thirty minutes of food presentation. This preference was not seen in controls, and was also exhibited by pregnant females with higher protein needs who were not experimentally protein-deficient. Rats also seem to have an unlearned appetite for calcium and sodium. In addition, zinc-depleted chicks show preferences for zinc-rich feeds.

== Indirect manipulation of specific appetite ==
Specific appetite can be indirectly induced under experimental circumstances. In one study, normal (sodium-replete) rats exposed to angiotensin II via infusion directly into the brain developed a strong sodium appetite which persisted for months. However, the conclusions of this experiment have been contested. Nicotine implants in rats have been shown to induce a specific appetite for sucrose, even after removal of the implants.

== In humans ==
There is very little strong evidence for specific appetite in humans. However, it has been demonstrated that humans have the ability to taste calcium, and indirect evidence supports the idea that patients on kidney dialysis who develop hypocalcemia prefer cheese with greater amounts of calcium added. Exercise also increases the preference for salt. Some diseases, including Gitelman syndrome and the salt-wasting variant of congenital adrenal hyperplasia, impair the kidneys' ability to retain sodium in the body and cause a specific craving for sodium. Extreme sodium depletion in human volunteers has been demonstrated to increase the desire for high-salt foods.

== Ongoing research ==
While the most common nutritional disorders in humans concern excessive intake of calories, malnutrition remains a problem. For example, the link between insufficient dietary calcium and bone disorders is well established.

Commonly people have an appetite for meat or eggs, high protein foods. But these may be expensive or otherwise unavailable. A specific appetite for protein may be unsatisfied with the ingestion of a diet deficient in protein. Because protein is vitally important to maintaining the structures of the body's systems, a form of protein-mediated hunger has been hypothesised. The protein leverage hypothesis posits that hunger is principally satiated by protein, with caloric intake being escalated until this need is met.

== See also ==
- Sensory-specific satiety
