= Diet and obesity =

Available dietary energy across time

Map of dietary energy availability per person per day in 1961 (kcal/person/day)

Map of dietary energy availability per person per day in 1979–1981 (kcal/person/day)

Map of dietary energy availability per person per day in 2001–2003 (kcal/person/day)
no data
<1600
1600–1800
1800–2000
2000–2200
2200–2400
2400–2600
2600–2800
2800–3000
3000–3200
3200–3400
3400–3600
>3600

Diet, specifically the Western pattern diet, plays an important role in the genesis of obesity. Personal choices, food advertising, social customs and cultural influences, as well as food availability and pricing all play a role in determining what and how much an individual eats.

== Dietary energy supply ==
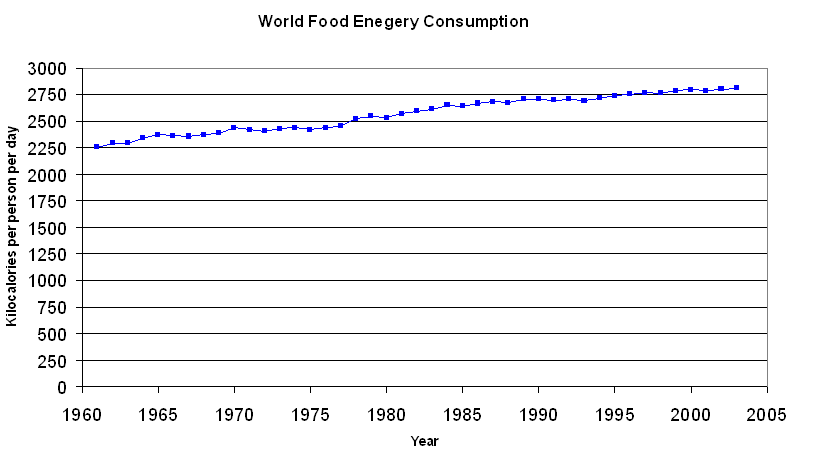
Average per capita energy consumption of the world from 1961 to 2002

The dietary energy supply is the food available for human consumption, usually expressed in kilocalories per person per day. It gives an overestimate of the total amount of food consumed as it reflects both food consumed and food wasted. The per capita dietary energy supply varies markedly between different regions and countries. It has also changed significantly over time. From the early 1970s to the late 1990s, the average calories available per person per day (the amount of food bought) has increased in all part of the world except Eastern Europe and parts of Africa. The United States had the highest availability with 3654 kilo calories per person in 1996. This increased further in 2002 to 3770. During the late 1990s, Europeans had 3394 kilo calories per person, in the developing areas of Asia there were 2648 kilo calories per person, and in sub-Sahara Africa people had 2176 kilo calories per person.

== Average calorie consumption ==
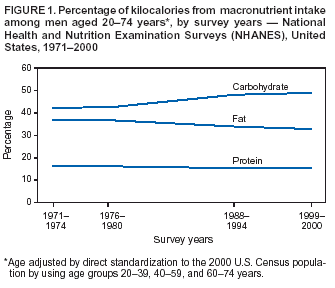
Change over time of the macronutrient composition of the US male diet

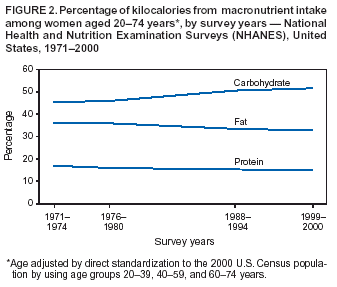
Change over time of the macronutrient composition of the US female diet

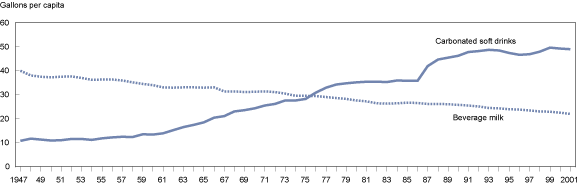
USDA chart showing the increase in soda consumption and the decrease in milk consumption from 1947 to 2001

From 1971 to 2000, the average daily number of calories which women consumed in the United States increased by 335 calories per day (1542 calories in 1971 and 1877 calories in 2000). According to a 2025 study from the CDC's National Center for Health Statistics, "Youth ages 1–18 years consumed a higher percentage of calories from ultra-processed foods (61.9%) than adults age 19 and older (53.0%)" (Williams et al.).For men, the average increase was 168 calories per day (2450 calories in 1971 and 2618 calories in 2000). Most of these extra calories came from an increase in carbohydrate consumption, though there was also an increase in fat consumption over the same time period. The increase in caloric consumption is attributed primarily to the "consumption of food away from home; increased energy consumption from salty snacks, soft drinks, and pizza; and increased portion sizes". Other sources note that the consumption of soft drinks and other sweetened beverages now accounts for almost 25 percent of daily calories in young adults in America. As these estimates are based on a person's recall, they may underestimate the amount of calories actually consumed.

== Fast food ==
As societies become increasingly reliant on energy-dense fast-food meals, the association between fast food consumption and obesity becomes more concerning. In the United States, consumption of fast food meals has tripled and calorie intake from fast food has quadrupled between 1977 and 1995. Consumption of sweetened drinks is also believed to be a major contributor to the rising rates of obesity.

== Portion size ==
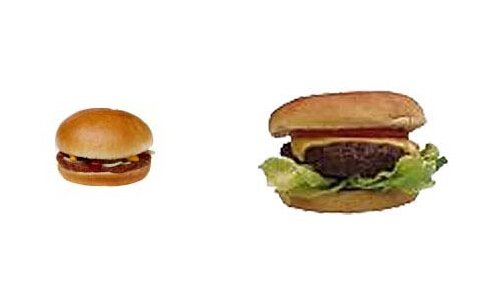
A comparison of a typical 1984 cheeseburger (left) of 333 calories with a 2004 cheeseburger (right) of 590 calories as per the National Heart, Lung, and Blood Institute

The portion size of many prepackage and restaurant foods has increased in both the United States and Denmark since the 1970s. Fast food servings, for example, are 2 to 5 times larger than they were in the 1980s. Evidence has shown that larger portions of energy-dense foods lead to greater energy intake and thus to greater rates of obesity.

== Meat consumption ==
A 2010 study published in the American Journal of Clinical Nutrition closely tracked 373,803 people over a period of 8 years across 10 countries. At its conclusion, the study reported that meat consumption (processed meat, red meat, & poultry) is positively associated with weight gain and increased abdominal obesity in men and women. In response, the National Cattlemen's Beef Association countered that increased meat consumption may not be associated with fat gain. However, a subsequent response controlled for just abdominal fat across a sample of 91,214 people found that even when controlling for calories and subjects with cancer or smoking cessation, meat consumption is linked with obesity. Further population studies, reviews, and meta-analysis studies have corroborated the claim that greater meat consumption is linked to greater rates of obesity, especially in regards to red meat and processed meat.

== Sugar consumption ==
Drinking more sugary beverages (including fruit juices, soft drinks, fruit drinks, sports drinks, energy and enhanced water drinks, sweetened iced tea, and lemonade) increases overall energy intake, and thus increases the risk of metabolic syndrome, obesity, and type 2 diabetes (see the pathophysiology of obesity). Children who consume more added sugar in foods and beverages have a higher risk of becoming overweight. By itself, sugar is not a factor causing obesity and metabolic syndrome, but rather – when over-consumed – is a component of unhealthy dietary behavior. Adults who increase or decrease their free sugar intake increase or decrease their weight.

Reviews indicate that governmental health policies should be implemented to discourage intake of sugar-sweetened beverages, and reduce the obesity in children and adults. Obesity has been rising in the 21st century. Other than adding excessive calories, the mechanisms by which high sugar consumption causes obesity are unclear because of limitations in clinical research involving uncontrolled factors, such as overall diet, physical activity, and sedentary lifestyle.

== Ultraprocessed food consumption ==
Numerous large studies have demonstrated that eating ultraprocessed food has a positive dose-dependent relationship with both abdominal obesity and general obesity in both men and women. Consuming a diet rich in unprocessed and minimally processed foods is linked with lower obesity risk and less chronic disease. These results are consistent among American, Canadian, Latin American, British, Australian, French, and Spaniard populations.

Particular processing ingredients used in ultraprocessed foods have been linked with increasing the risk of obesity further. Intake of trans fat from industrial oils has been associated with increased abdominal obesity in men and increased weight and waist circumference in women. These associations were not attenuated when fat intake and calorie intake was accounted for.

Similarly, heavy consumption of fried food is linked to greater obesity risk on a population level. On a more individual level, the relative risk of fried food consumption and increased weight gain seems to depend on genetic predisposition.

== Social policy and change ==
Prevalence of obesity in the adult population by region (2000–2016)

Prevalence of obesity in the adult population in 2016

New agricultural technologies have led to an overall reduction in the cost of food relative to household income, especially in high-income countries. In his popular book, "The Omnivore's Dilemma," the journalist Michael Pollan linked the subsidies offered to farmers of corn, soy, wheat, and rice through the U.S. farm bill to over-consumption of calories derived from these crops and to rising obesity rates. While increased consumption of foods derived from these commodities is correlated with an increase in BMI (at the population level), no current research supports a causal relationship between farm subsidies and obesity. From a policy perspective, the cost of sugar would actually decrease in the US if the commodity support programs in the farm bill were removed, largely due to the tariffs in the farm bill that restrict the importation of lower-cost sugar available on the global market.

Participation by adults in the United States Department of Agriculture Supplemental Nutrition Assistance Program (i.e. Food Stamps) is positively associated with obesity, waist circumference, elevated fasting glucose, and metabolic syndrome.

== Metabolism ==
Evidence does not support the commonly expressed view that some obese people eat little yet gain weight due to a slow metabolism. On average obese people have a greater energy expenditure than normal weight or thin people and actually have higher basal metabolic rates. This is because it takes more energy to maintain an increased body mass. Obese people also underreport how much food they consume compared to those of normal weight. Tests of human subjects carried out in a calorimeter support this conclusion.

== See also ==
- Abdominal obesity
- Criticism of fast food
- List of countries by dietary calorie intake
- Satiety value
