= Soul food health trends =

Healthy soul food
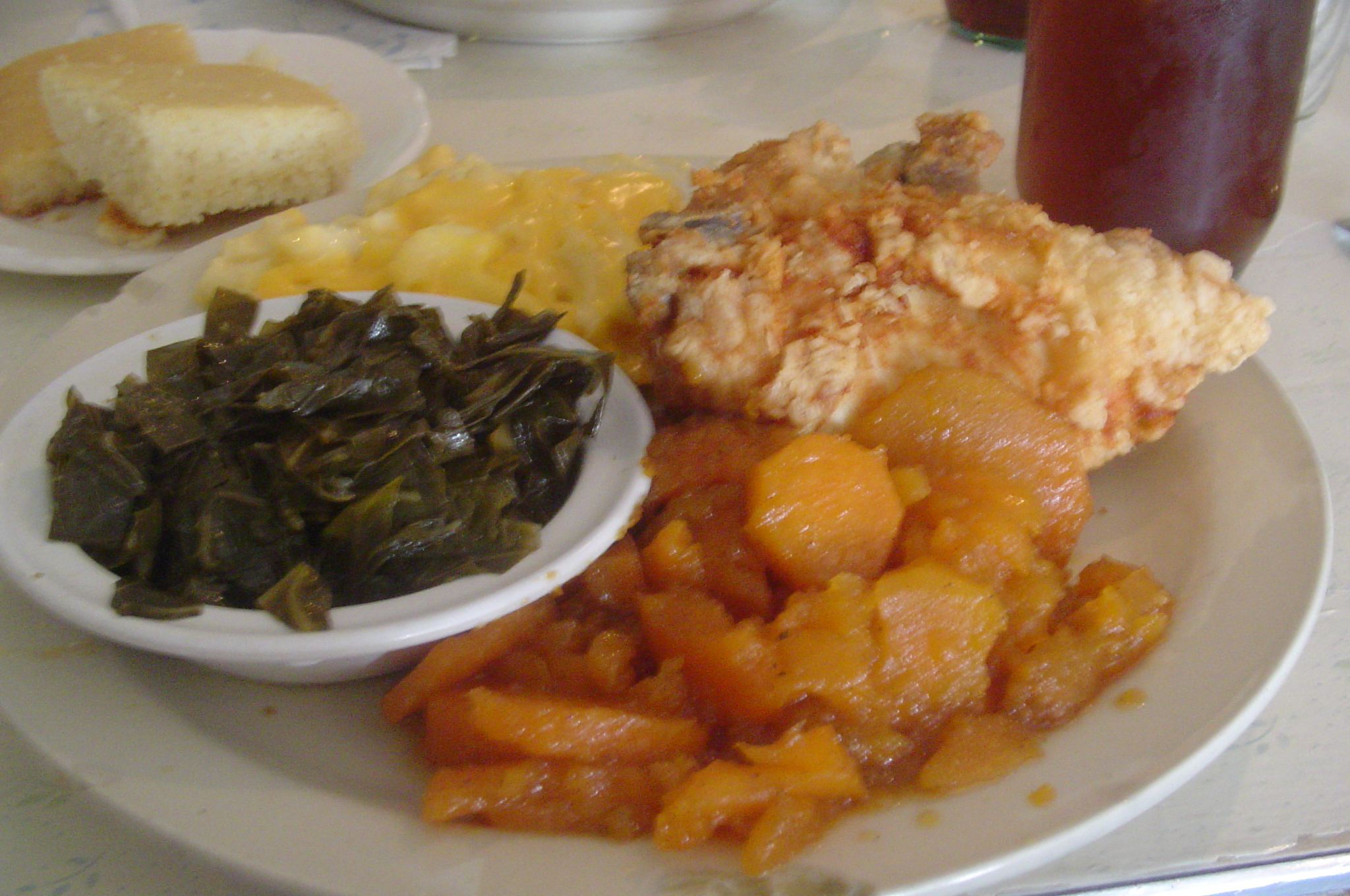
- Course: Main course
- Place of origin: Antebellum South
- Region or state: Northeastern, Midwestern, Mid-Atlantic, Southern (list), Western, Southwestern and other
- Associated cuisine: American
- Main ingredients: blueberry; corn; okra; pecan; potato; pumpkin; sunflower seed

Soul food is a kind of African American cuisine that encompasses a variety of fried, roasted, and boiled food dishes consisting of chicken and pork, sweet potatoes, corn, leafy greens and other vegetables. Soul food has long been embedded in African American culture, but pushes towards healthy eating habits, for both physical and mental health, have adapted soul food cuisine to fit within health trends. This article describes modifications of traditional soul food within health trends, including soul food with low carb, soul food with low sugar, soul food with low fat, soul food for vegan and soul food in gluten-free.

== The culture and history of soul food ==
Being one kind of traditional cuisine of American Americans in the Southern U.S, soul food is also described as "seductive, satisfying, filling, spicy, high-fat, spiritual, traditional cuisine of Black Americans, especially southern Blacks". Soul food cuisine evolves from a long history of slavery, persecution and segregation against Black Americans. To produce the distinctive African American cuisine, enslaved workers that were brought to the USA combined their West African cooking methods with European and Native American cuisine patterns in a process known as Creolization. African Americans often had to cook with whatever foods that were accessible to them, developing eating habits that were distinct from wealthier white Americans.

== Functions of soul food ==
Troisi and Wrigh (2017) claimed that food consumption of food is not only out of hunger, but also for its emotional, cultural and symbolic meanings. To prove that idea, an empirical research was done to analyse how food works in both physical and mental aspects. After the research, they concluded that people's thought, desire and evolution for particular food depend on their mental association and social psychological processes. In other words, both biological and psychological needs affect food choice, implying that comfort food can be applied in psychology.

== Factors affecting healthier food choices ==
There are beliefs, barriers and self-efficiency issues that affect food consumption and food choice. Most commonly, people suffer from time scarcity because of the effort involved in planning, shopping, preparation, cooking, eating and cleaning. A survey was conducted between 57 African Americans to assess their those aspects that relate to healthy eating. It is found that although people have awareness and knowledge about healthy eating, the survey showed that there are barriers that restrict people's healthy eating, with price of healthy food as main barriers in food choice. In addition to price, access to healthy and natural ingredients is another obstacle for many Americans as food insecurity is rampant and many Americans live in a Food desert.

More broadly, a project conducted showed that factors that influence diet and life styles come from individual, social, cultural and community aspects. The research showed that high-fat traditional food preferences, frying and addition of salted meats to vegetables are based on ethnic differences in dietary intake and culture traditions.

As a result, with those barriers prevent people from healthy eating, the increasing consumption relates to the demand of unhealthy soul food leads to health disparities, such as obesity, diabetes or hypertension. This is especially common among African American, which is one of the largest ethnic minority groups in United States.

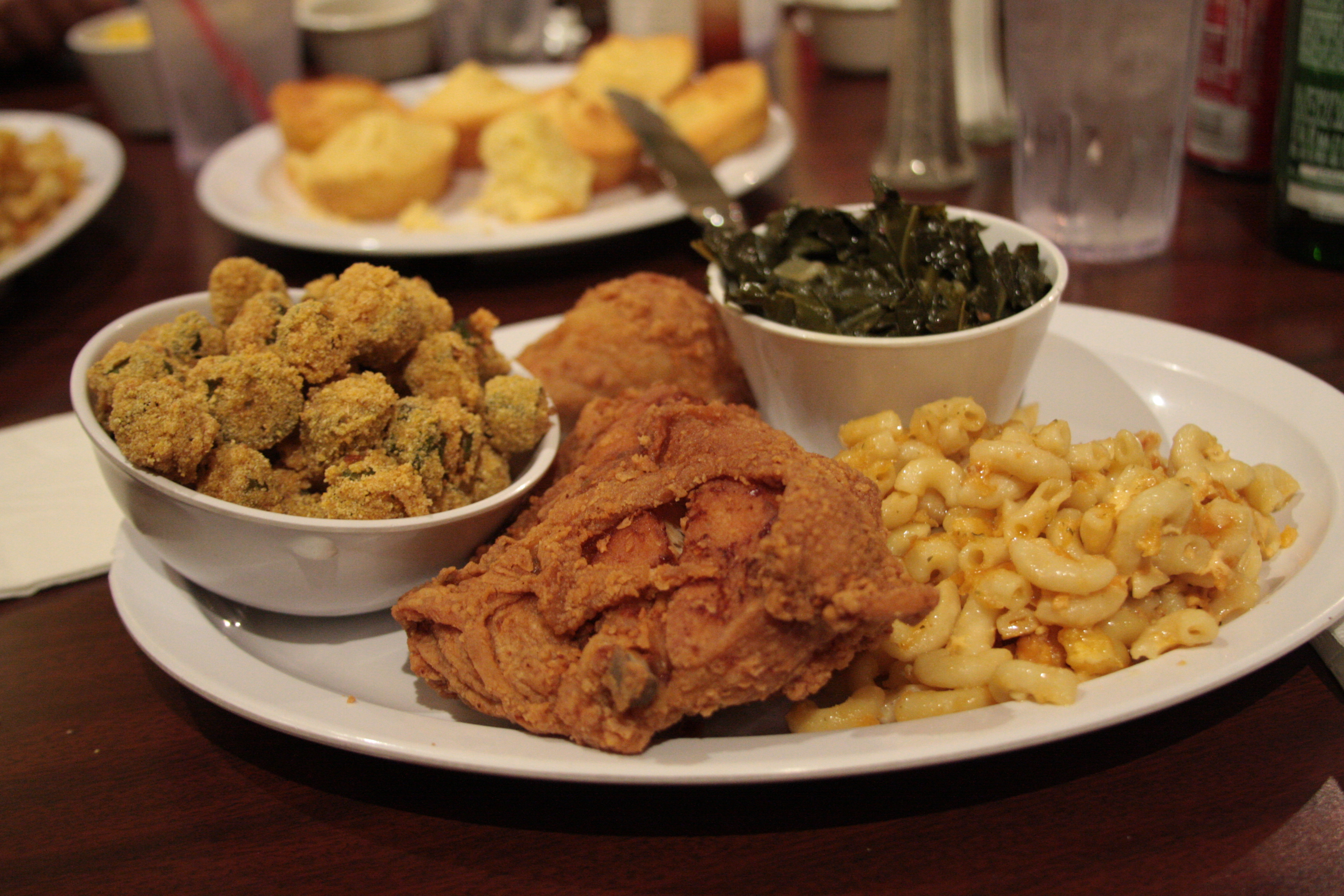
Traditional Soul Food

== Modifying soul food to fit within health trends ==
With the improvement of economic status, the number of people who suffer from hunger has dramatically decreased, especially in developed countries. However, more and more people are experiencing high stress levels, overconsumption of fast food and sweets, getting less sleep, etc., which contributes to depression, anxiety, obesity, diabetes, hypertension, cancers and so on, especially among African Americans. As a result, more and more people claim that focus should be on the quality of food rather than quantity.

Although many healthy foods comprise soul food (f.e. collards, okra, rice, legumes and sweet potato), soul food also can be high in fat from various meats, especially pork, seasoned with lard or other animal fats. Along with barriers that prevent African Americans from choosing healthy food, they suffer from chronic diseases such as heart disease, cancer and diabetes. Diet as one of the important lifestyle factors, is important in preventing health conditions, thus recipes of soul food should be modified to be healthy, accessible and affordable, especially in aspects of alternative ingredients and cooking methods.

Dietary Approach to Stop Hypertension to produce healthy soul food is one example of diet plan, to reduce risks of diseases that caused by unhealthy diet. It maintains flavour and acceptability of traditional soul foods and meet people's nutrient requirement at the same time. Moreover, Food of Health and Soul is another local faith community that "support families' interest in retaining their cultural foods while reducing dietary fat, sodium, and sugar and increasing fiber".

Low carb is also known as low carbohydrate, high fat. Diabetes Research and clinical Practice found that low carb positively affects glucose control in patients with type 2 diabetes, triglycerides and HDL (high density lipoprotein). It is suggested that ideal diet requires less than 130 g of carbohydrate a day and claims to be promoted as a permanent lifestyle choice through books and websites. For example, people are suggested to eat green vegetables, meat, fish, eggs, and just as well as whole fat dairy and olive oil.

=== Soul food with low sugar ===
Desserts with high sugar are commonly consumed for hedonistic rewards, especially among women. However, high sugar intake tends to increase risk of obesity, type 2 diabetes, hypertension, cardio-metabolic diseases and compromised oral health.

=== Soul food with low fat ===
Although low-fat and nonfat products contain more sugar than regular products, the UK government announced guidelines that encourage people to consume low-fat products for the aim of reducing cholesterol and saturated fat in the diet.

When preparing recipes, spices and herbs can be used to replace sodium and fat for flavour enhancers. Soups are a good example of foods that are low in fat but are still considered satisfying to eat. Firstly, they are quick and easy to prepare. Some of them only need to be boiled with water and simple spices, such as pumpkin soup, tomato and egg soup, etc. They have significantly fewer calories and are also convenient and cost-effective. Secondly, soups can be cooked with various vegetables or meat, such as pork ribs and carrot soup, chicken soup with spinach, etc., that provide different kinds of nutrition that people need.

Moreover, seen as a comfort food in history, soups help lessen cold symptoms and warm the soul, especially in winter. As Elizabeth Arndt said, soup increases the feeling of fullness while reducing the total calorie intake. Besides, soups with chowders and stews effectively help meet the recorded daily needs for fiber, protein, vitamins, and minerals, thus having positive effects on people's health and wellbeing.

=== Soul food in gluten-free ===
Study showed that gluten-containing food have risks of causing celiac diseases and gluten-induced disorder for those who are in genetically susceptible individuals and there are also people that are wheat allergy. Under that circumstance, Lu, Zhang, Luoto and Ren suggested more choices and variation in the diet, especially for breakfast. In addition, peas with 85% protein have a rich amino acid profile that will be ideal for people with celiac disease, gluten intolerance and other food allergy. Besides, some grains including brown rice, sorghum, amaranth, quinoa, millet and wild rice are also gluten-free in nature.

However, the research showed that the subjective difficulty in following a gluten-free diet (GFD) comes from main reasons of age, education level, advice on starting a GFD, duration before discovering a gluten intolerance, food choices and ways of GFD management. Accordingly, education about celiac disease and gluten-induced disorder can be conducted among healthcare practitioners to increase their awareness, as well as early diagnosis and intervention of gluten-induced disorders.

== High profile advocates: promotes ==
People are increasingly paying attention to healthy lifestyle. Although soul food are fast and easy to consume in the fast-paced life, where people suffer from healthy issues, modifying soul food within healthy trends become necessary. To better promote soul food within healthy trends, there are three ways for advocating.

1. Healthy soul food can be used to satisfy both biological and psychological needs.
2. Secondly, since women mainly prepare food in the family and make effects on later generation, the nutrition programs can mainly target women, as well as people in different socioeconomic groups.
3. Thirdly, culture can be embedded into diet and healthy eating can be advocated in community level. Under that circumstance, It will be familiar and relevant to African American, helping reach them and change their food choice and intake.
4. Moreover, the program can embrace culture facility and relevance and consider environmental influences. Food For Health and Soul is a successful example of culturally appropriate approach that effectively reaches African American and promotes their healthy food intake.

Since chronic diseases commonly happen on people all around the world, modifying soul food within healthy trends should be promoted not only among African Americans, but also people all over the world. Healthy eating along with regular physical activities, as two main lifestyle factors, can work together in promote health and wellbeing.
