= Acquired taste =

Appreciation of something initially unpleasant

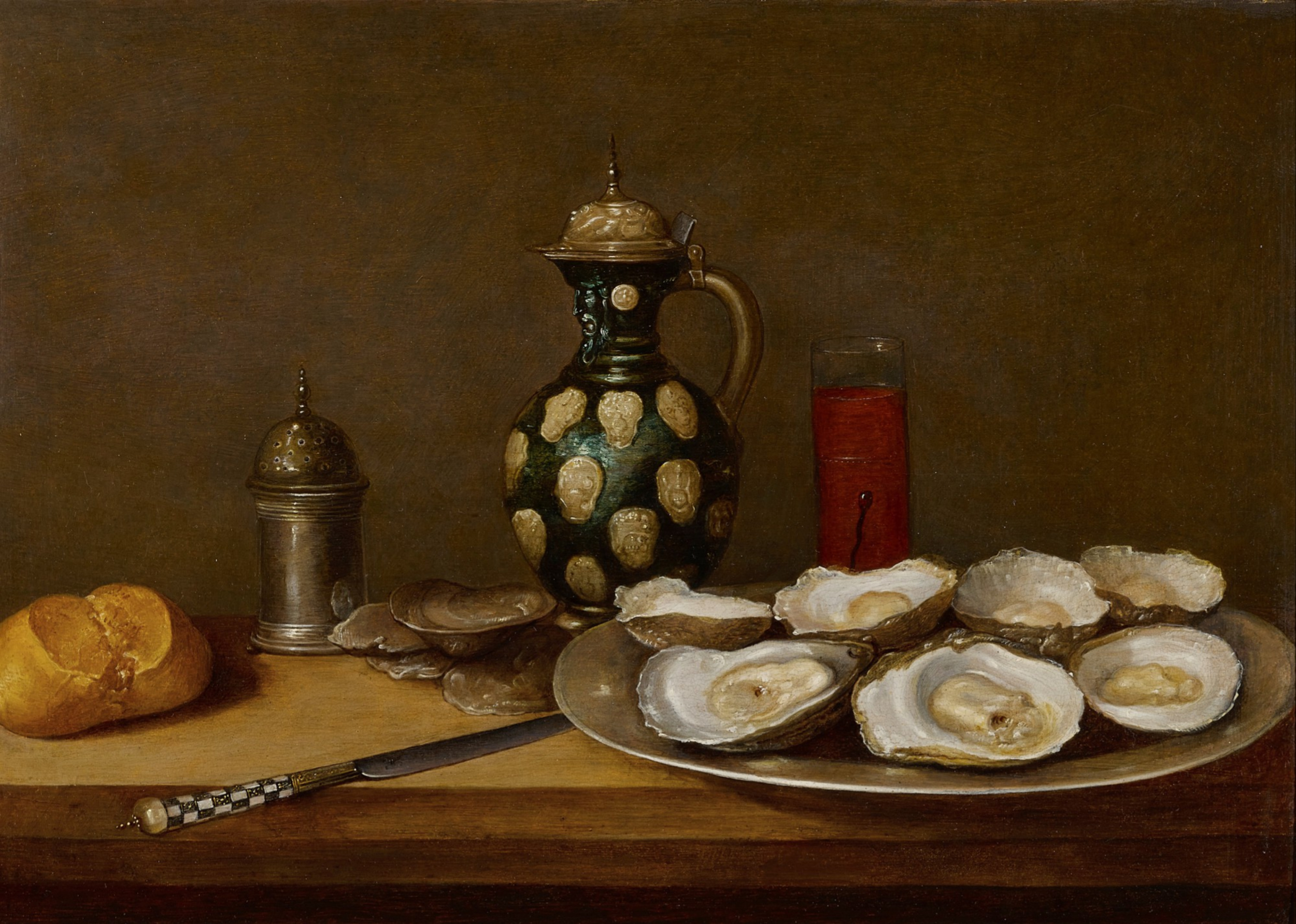
Oysters are an example of a food often described as being an "acquired taste"

An acquired taste is an appreciation for something unlikely to be enjoyed by a person who has not had substantial exposure to it. It is the opposite of innate taste, which is the appreciation for things that are enjoyable by most people without prior exposure to them.

== Characteristics ==
In case of food and drink, the difficulty of enjoying the product may be due to a strong or unpleasant odor, taste, mouthfeel (such as sashimi and sushi featuring uncooked seafood), appearance, or association (such as eating insects or organ meat).

== Acquisition ==
=== General ===
The process of acquiring a taste can involve developmental maturation, genetics (of both taste sensitivity and personality), family example, and biochemical reward properties of foods. Infants are born preferring sweet foods and rejecting sour and bitter tastes, and they develop a preference for salt at approximately 4 months. However, vegetables tend to be a favorite as they start to learn to feed themselves. Neophobia (fear of novelty) tends to vary with age in predictable, but not linear, ways. Babies just beginning to eat solid foods generally accept a wide variety of foods, toddlers and young children are relatively neophobic towards food, and older children, adults, and the elderly are often adventurous eaters with wide-ranging tastes.

The general personality trait of novelty-seeking does not necessarily correlate highly with willingness to try new foods. Level of food adventurousness may explain much of the variability of food preferences observed in "supertasters". Supertasters are highly sensitive to bitter, spicy, and pungent flavors, and some avoid them and like to eat only mild, plain foods, but many supertasters who have high food adventurousness enjoy these intense flavors and seek them out. Some chemicals or combinations of chemicals in foods provide both flavor and beneficial or enjoyable effects on the body and mind and may be reinforcing, leading to an acquired taste. A study that investigated the effect of adding caffeine and theobromine (active compounds in chocolate) vs. a placebo to identically flavored drinks that participants tasted several times, yielded the development of a strong preference for the drink with the compounds.

=== Intentional ===
Intentionally changing one's preferences can be hard to accomplish. It usually requires a deliberate effort, acting as if one likes something in order to have the responses and feelings that will produce the desired taste. The challenge becomes one of distinguishing authentic or legitimate acquired tastes as a result of deeply considered preference changes from inauthentic ones motivated by status or conformity.

== See also ==
- Aftertaste
- Food choice
- Food preferences in older adults and seniors
- Habituation
- Taste
