= Conditioned satiety =

Suppression of appetite

Conditioned satiety is one of the three known food-specific forms of suppression of appetite for food by effects of eating, along with alimentary alliesthesia and sensory-specific satiety. Conditioned satiety was first evidenced in 1955 in rats by the late French physiologist professor Jacques Le Magnen. The term was coined in 1972 by professor David Allenby Booth. Unlike the other two sorts of stimulus-specific satiety, this phenomenon is based on classical conditioning but is distinct from conditioned taste aversion (CTA) in its dependence on internal state towards the end of a meal.

== Description of the phenomenon ==
Conditioned satiety is thought to be acquired when a food with a given flavour is eaten on a partly full stomach and followed promptly by a mildly aversive digestive event ("bloat"). However, it is uncertain if and how this phenomenon may occur under real-life conditions as normally more than food of one given flavor is ingested during a meal. It has been widely misunderstood as an association of the sensory properties of a food with its energy content (calories) or carbohydrate content. However that is a confusion with the conditioning of simple aversion or a contrast with simple conditioned preference. Conditioned satiety has only been evidenced in experiments with rats, monkeys or humans when a flavour and fullness together have been paired with concentrated maltodextrin. When a whole meal of concentrated maltodextrin is eaten without changing its flavour, only the conditioning of preference for the flavour early in the meal is seen. Rats, monkeys and people can learn conditioned satiety within one or two pairings although in the first experiments the rats needed several days to adapt their intakes because the test food was aversively flavoured or textured. The particularity of conditioned satiety is that the time lapse between intake (and thus sensory stimulation) and the aversively conditioning after-effect is much shorter (less than 15 minutes) than that feasible for the conditioning of simple aversion to taste, odour or texture by poisoning, which can occur with a delay in postabsorptive effects of 12 or more hours.
