= U4HK =

U4HK(United for Healthier Kids)
- Founded: 2015
- Type: Non Profit Organisation
- Purpose: Well being of children.
- Method: Aims to help parents establish healthier eating, drinking and lifestyle habits for children aged 4 to 12.
- Website: U4HK Website

United for Healthier Kids is a health initiative movement that aims to help raise healthier kids by encouraging healthy eating, drinking and changes in everyday routines for children aged 4–12 years. Four behaviors identified and focused upon to improve children's health include more water, more fruits & vegetables, more managed portions and more movement.
