= Sweetened beverage =

Type of beverage

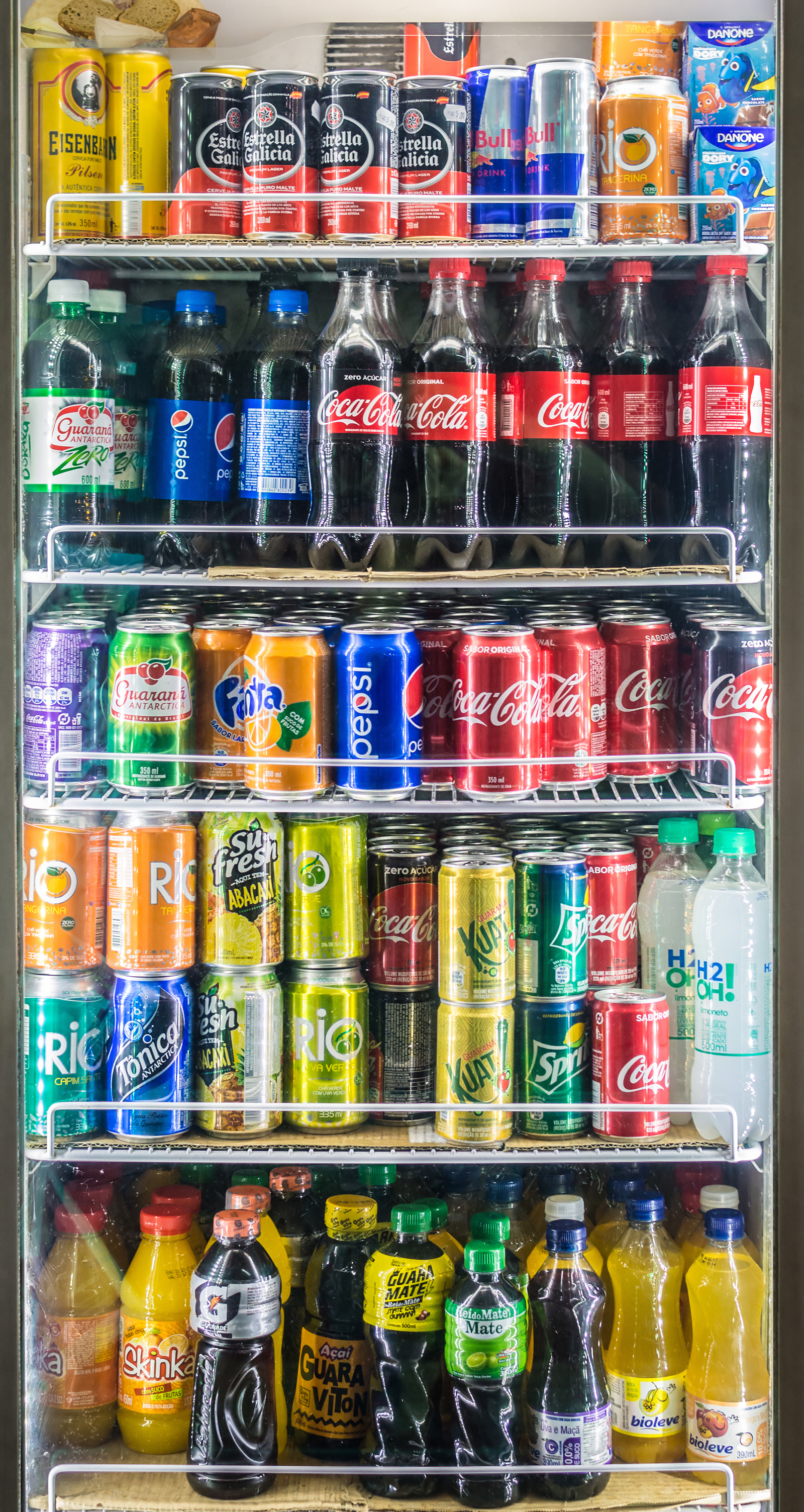
Soft drinks displayed on the shelves of a supermarket in Brazil

Sugar-sweetened beverages (SSB) are beverages sweetened with added sugar. Because a substantial amount is usually added, they have been described as "liquid candy". Added sugars include brown sugar, corn sweetener, corn syrup, dextrose (also known as glucose), fructose, high-fructose corn syrup, honey, invert sugar (a mixture of fructose and glucose), lactose, malt syrup, maltose, molasses, raw sugar, sucrose, trehalose, and turbinado sugar. Naturally occurring sugars, such as those in fruit or milk, are not considered to be added sugars. Free sugars include monosaccharides and disaccharides added to foods and beverages by the manufacturer, cook or consumer, and sugars naturally present in honey, syrups, fruit juices and fruit juice concentrates.

Consumption of sugar-sweetened beverages is linked to weight gain and an increased risk of cardiovascular disease mortality. According to the CDC, consumption of sweetened beverages is also associated with unhealthy behaviors like smoking, not getting enough sleep and exercise, and eating fast food often and not enough fruits regularly.

Artificially sweetened beverages (ASB) are defined as those containing non-nutritive sweeteners and are marketed as a replacement for sugar-sweetened beverages. Similar to sugar-sweetened beverages, they are linked to weight gain and an increased risk of cardiovascular disease mortality.

== Prevalence of sweetened beverage consumption ==
Humans have been drinking sweet beverages for thousands of years in the form of fruit juice, mead, and sweetened wine. A lemon drink sweetened with sugar was first documented in Mamluk Egypt between the tenth and thirteenth centuries. Sweetened hot chocolate was developed in Europe in the 17th century. The increase in consumption of sweetened beverages over the past several decades has been described as a worldwide health problem, but it is particularly visible in the United States, where many modern drinks, like sodas, originated. In the US, sweetened beverages such as most sodas are the most widely consumed type of foods containing added sugar, and they account for about a third of all consumption of added sugars (about half if counted together with fruit juice; about twice the amount that is gained from the categories of "desserts" and "sweets"). They represent about 7% of total energy intake, where they can account for up to 15% in children, and have been described as the "largest single food source of calories in the US diet". The consumption of sweetened beverages has increased in the US since the 1970s, accounting for a significant portion (perhaps as high as a half) of the rise in caloric intake among the American populace. Some more recent research suggests that the added sugar consumption in the US has started declining in the 21st century, due to a related decrease in the consumption of sweetened beverages, encouraged by the government health awareness initiative and other programs.

In 1999, sugar consumption in the U.S. peaked at nearly half a pound per person per day, but has declined since then. High fructose syrup (HFCS) consumption, which in 1999 amounted to over 65 lb per person per year, largely in the form of sugar-sweetened beverages, dropped to 39.5 lb by 2021.

According to the Centers for Disease Control, the Behavioral Risk Factor Surveillance System Survey found that 30.1% of American adults consume at least one sugar-sweetened beverage daily.

== Health effects of sugar-sweetened beverages ==
There is an association between increased consumption of sweetened beverages and weight gain leading to obesity, coronary heart disease, diabetes, liver disease, dental implications, and gout.

Reducing consumption of sugar-sweetened beverages can reduce the risk of unhealthy weight gain in adults. The World Health Organization (WHO) has developed guidance on free sugars, based on the impact of free sugar intake on weight gain and dental issues. For a normal calorie diet, calories from added sugars should be less than 10 percent of the daily calorie limit. Eating habits that include a lesser amount of added sugars, which can be from reduced intake of sugary drinks, can be associated with reduced risk of CVD in adults, and moderate evidence indicates that these eating patterns are associated with reduced risk of obesity, type 2 diabetes, and some types of cancer in adults.

=== Obesity ===
Along with the increase in the prevalence of obesity, the consumption of carbohydrates, particularly in the form of added sugars, has increased. Sugar-sweetened beverages contribute to the overall energy density of diets.

There is a correlation between drinking sugar-sweetened beverages and gaining weight or becoming obese. Sugar-sweetened beverages show lower satiety values for the same calories compared to solid foods, which may cause one to consume more calories. A 2023 review found that sweetened beverage consumption promotes higher body mass index and body weight in both children and adults.

=== Oral health ===
Oral health can be harmed by sugar-sweetened beverages, especially by acid erosion and dental caries. Frequency of sugar sweetened beverages results in dental caries, which are caused when Streptococcus bacteria within the plaque metabolize the sugar, releasing various acids as waste compounds. The acids lower salivary pH and dissolve the enamel.

Acid erosion is the loss of tooth enamel caused by acid attack. When consuming carbonated sugar-sweetened beverages, acid contacts the teeth, attacking the enamel. Over time, the enamel erodes, leading to dental caries. Erosion of tooth enamel begins at a pH of 5.5, and ingredients found in sugar-sweetened beverages such as phosphoric acid and citric acid significantly contribute to the demineralization of the enamel.

Consumption of sports and energy drinks have been linked to tooth damage. This is especially common in adolescents who consume about 30–50% of the beverages that are on the market. Studies suggest that energy drinks may cause twice as much damage to teeth as sports drinks. Citric acid, found in many sugar-sweetened beverages, causes stripping of the enamel.

Fruit juices generally contain lower amounts of sugar than carbonated sugar-sweetened beverages. The acidity levels found in fruit juices vary, with citrus-based juices having the lowest pH levels, leading to a higher risk of cavities with enamel exposure.

=== Type 2 diabetes ===
There is a link between sugar-sweetened beverage consumption and risk of type 2 diabetes mellitus. Type 2 diabetes is unlikely to be caused directly by sugar. It is likely that weight gain caused by sugar-sweetened beverage consumption is what increases the risk of type 2 diabetes.

In 2017, 15 national organizations including the American Cancer Society, American Heart Association, and American Medical Association stated "sugary drinks are a major contributor to the increasing rates of type 2 diabetes and heart disease".

=== Kidney disease ===
Sugar consumption has been associated with the rising prevalence of chronic kidney disease in the United States. Dietary sugar is associated with CKD risk factors and data from animal studies suggest that sugar consumption affects kidney disease risk. Studies were completed with a variety of test subjects to account for age, sex, diets, lifestyle choices, physical activity, smoking, level of education, and health status. Also, the experiments consisted of a variety of consumption frequencies, ranging from one to more than seven glasses of a sugary-sweetened beverage a week.

=== Cancer ===
There is no evidence that sweetened beverages are a direct cause of cancer. There is an indirect relationship between sugar-sweetened beverage consumption and increased risk of obesity-related cancers. They are related to cancer risk in their association with excess body weight. The World Cancer Research Fund has stated that "there is strong evidence that regularly drinking sugar-sweetened drinks can cause weight gain which in turn can cause many cancers".

=== Sugar addiction ===
In a 2017 study, the notion of sugar addiction was challenged. The study examined a sample of 1495 human participants to determine if foods mainly containing sugar cause "addiction-like" problems that meet clinical Diagnostic and Statistical Manual of Mental Disorders criteria for substance dependence. The researchers also investigated whether potential dependence on sugar relates to body weight and negative affectivity such as mood depression. The results revealed that the majority of participants experienced at least one symptom of food dependence for combined high-fat savoury (30%) and high-fat sweet (25%) foods while only a minority experienced such problems for low-fat/savoury (2%) and mainly sugar-containing foods (5%). Furthermore, while addictive-like symptoms for high-fat savoury and high-fat sweet foods correlated to overweight conditions, this was not found to be the case for foods mainly containing sugar. Consequently, the findings indicated that sugary foods have a minimal role in contributing to food dependence and the increased risk of weight gain. While human studies show that sugar by itself plays a small role in food addiction, animal studies show that sugar can produce addiction-like behavior in controlled conditions. In 2005, Avena, Long, and Hobel investigated whether intermittent sugar access gives rats addiction-like behavior. They specifically were testing the deprivation effect. This effect is commonly used in drug research to measure cravings. Female Sprague-Dawley rats were assigned to a long access group or a short access group; they got daily access to glucose for either 12 hours of 25% glucose or 30 minutes daily, respectively. After 28 days, both groups had a 14-day abstinence period and then got reintroduced to glucose. The long access group was observed having a significant increase in pressing the lever to access glucose compared to the baseline and the short access group. This was interpreted as evidence of an increase in motivation or craving following the abstinence from sugar access, which is similar to relapse patterns in individuals with substance use disorders, showing that sugar addiction may be relevant and does create a dependence.

=== Milk vs sweetened beverage consumption ===
Research has demonstrated when school aged children (3–7 yrs. of age) are given the choice of choosing milk or sweetened beverages at lunch time, they tend to choose the sweetened beverages. This has major health implications for children, as nutrition is essential for proper development. Studies have shown sugar-sweetened beverages displace important nutrients such as iron and calcium which result in deficiency-related conditions. For example, iron deficiency can result in nerve impulse delay. Children who do not consume the appropriate amount of calcium in their daily diets have lower calcium consumption as they get older. In contrast, as they get older, their intake of sugary beverages increases. Many children grow to have a level of intolerance to milk and another significant percentage grow to not like the taste of milk. Insufficient levels of calcium throughout adolescence is a precursor for osteoporosis and even obesity in some cases. Maternal consumption of milk can influence children's consumption. A study of 9-year-old girls and calcium consumption reported that those who met the average recommended intake (AI) for calcium consumed almost twice as much milk and fewer sweetened beverages (18%) and had mothers who drank milk more frequently than those who were under the AI for calcium.

=== Caffeine ===
Children who drink SSBs that contain caffeine show addictive behavior that can be similar to substance use disorders (SUDs). The children can show symptoms like cravings, loss of control, and withdrawal symptoms. This is because the drinks that combine sugar and caffeine stimulate the brain’s reward system, which then can lead to repeated consumption.

=== Other ===
High sugar-sweetened beverage consumption is associated with an increased risk of gallstone disease, hypertension, all-cause mortality and cardiovascular disease (CVD) mortality.

== Health effects of artificially sweetened beverages ==
Non-nutritive sweeteners (NNSs) have been introduced into the market in non-caloric drinks such as diet sodas. These artificial sweeteners are popular due to the growing demand for alternatives to SSBs. Consumption of artificially sweetened beverages (ASBs) with low-caloric NNSs has risen worldwide in recent years, with reports of consumption in approximately 30% of adults and 15% of children in the USA between 2007 and 2008.

The American Cancer Society and the Public Health Law Center have stated that "Although the federal government and expert panels have deemed some artificial sweeteners safe from a food safety perspective, the science is not conclusive when it comes to other health impacts from drinking artificially sweetened beverages". In 2023, the World Health Organization published a new guideline on artificial sweeteners advising against their use to control body weight or reduce the risk of noncommunicable diseases. They concluded that replacing sugar sweeteners with artificial sweeteners did not promote weight loss in the long term in adults and children.

Epidemiological studies have been conducted to see whether or not artificially sweetened beverages pose a risk for the development of certain diseases. Due to their ability to dissociate the sensation of sweet from caloric intake via hormonal changes, they may increase appetite and promote larger food consumption and weight gain. Studies have found various negative health outcomes associated with ASBs, including weight gain, obesity and an increased risk of hypertension and type II diabetes.

High consumption of artificially sweetened beverages is associated with an increased risk of all-cause mortality and cardiovascular disease (CVD) mortality.

The National Cancer Institute, Cancer Council Australia and Cancer Research UK have stated there is no convincing evidence that artificial sweeteners cause cancer.

== Influences on children's beverage consumption ==
Taste preferences and eating behaviors in children are molded at a young age by factors such as parents' habits and advertisements.

Parents One study compared what parents and children considered when choosing beverages. For the most part, parents considered whether beverages had sugar, caffeine, and additives. Some of the 7- to 10-year-old children in the study also mentioned "additives" and "caffeine", which may be unfamiliar terms to them. This showed the possibility of the parents' influence on their children's decision-making on food choice and eating behaviors.

Advertising Although many factors contribute to eating behaviors and food choices in children, food advertising and media are also important factors to consider. Marketing and media influences include television advertising, in-school marketing, product placements, kids clubs, the internet, toys and products with brand logos, and youth-targeted promotions. Marketers heavily target children and adolescents as consumers because of the amount of their own money spent annually, their influence on household food purchases, and their future as adult consumers. It has been estimated that US adolescents spend $140 billion a year. Of that, children under 12 years spend another $25 billion and may have the potential to influence another $200 billion of spending per year. Although there are limited studies on the effects of food advertisement on actual food intake, a literature review concluded that children exposed to advertising will choose advertised food products, attempt to influence food purchases of their parents, and request specific brands, all at higher rates compared to children not exposed.

== Public health interventions ==
The World Health Organization has advised reducing intake of free sugars, such as monosaccharides and disaccharides that are added to beverages by manufacturers, cooks, or consumers. The Obesity Society recommends minimizing children's intake of sugar-sweetened beverages.

Efforts to reduce consumption of sugar-sweetened beverages and obesity include both monetary penalties and limiting exposure to sugar-sweetened beverages.

Economists estimate that increasing sugar sweetened beverage prices by 10% would reduce sugar sweetened beverage consumption by 12%. Global experts in fiscal policies concluded that a minimum of 20% increase in sugar-sweetened beverage taxes would result in proportional reduction in consumption. Other solutions target children, focusing on prohibiting sugar-sweetened beverages on school/after care property, including vending machines and lunches. Limits are also being considered on sugar-sweetened beverages in the workplace. Furthermore, beverage companies are being approached about reducing portion sizing of sugar-sweetened beverages because portion sizes have increased substantially over the past few decades.

Some countries have tried to reduce sugary beverages in an effort to bring liquid caloric intake down. Mexico placed a tax on |sugar-sweetened beverages (SSBs) in 2014. Drinks that were not taxed included drinks with NNSs, milk with no added sugar, and water. Other governments are active in placing policy on school lunches or what is being offered in school cafeterias regarding beverages. Governmental activity is trying to eventually slow down the obesity epidemic.

=== United States ===
The following drinks have been classified in the US as sweetened beverages if they contain sugar or other caloric sweeteners: fruit or fruit-flavored drinks, energy drinks, flavored water, coffees, teas, nonalcoholic wines and beers.

Around the United States, sugar-sweetened beverage intake differs based on geographic regions and socio-demographic characteristics. For example, 47.1% of Mississippi adults consume at least one sugar-sweetened beverage a day.

A sugary drink tax was recommended by the Institute of Medicine in 2009. Numerous states, including Vermont, have proposed taxing sugar-sweetened beverages or increasing the prices to reduce consumption.

The Healthy Schools Campaign is an initiative set forth by Michelle Obama that promotes nutritional enrichment through food and education. The national initiatives under this program are cooking up change, green clean schools, school nurse leadership, and national collaborations. As a result, many of the sugary drinks/ sodas in elementary, middle, and high schools have been replaced by water and other nutritious drinks.

== See also ==
- Diet and obesity
- List of coffee drinks
- Ultra-processed food
