= Expected satiety =

Anticipated relief from hunger provided by a food

Expected satiety is the amount of relief from hunger that is expected from a particular food.

One estimate in the United Kingdom suggested that there may be a six-fold difference in foods commonly consumed when they are compared calorie for calorie. This range of variation is important because expected satiety is thought to be a good predictor of food choice and an excellent predictor of self-selected portion sizes.

Some researchers suggest that expected satiety is an important mediator of energy intake. They argue that within-meal events (immediate feedback, e.g., gastric stretch) play a relatively minor role and that meal size is largely determined by decisions about portion size, before a meal begins. Consistent with this proposition, observational studies show that 'plate cleaning' is extremely common, that humans tend to plan their meal size in advance, and that ad libitum eating is relatively rare.

== Measurement ==
Selecting a portion in a measure of expected satiety

Measurement uses an approach based on a 'method of constant stimuli'. A conceptually similar alternative is to use a 'method of adjustment'. Participants are shown a picture of a standard food next to a picture of a comparison food. Participants change the size of the comparison portion using keyboard responses.

== Determinants ==
Expectations about the effects of a food are learned over time. It would appear that the expected satiety and expected satiation of foods increases as they become familiar.

Subtle changes to the flavor or texture of food can have a marked effect. Expected satiation may be higher in foods that have a higher protein content, and in those that require more chewing and that are eaten slowly. Expected satiety and expected satiation of foods may be influenced by their perceived weight.

== See also ==
- Satiety value
