= David A. Booth =

English psychologist (born 1938)

- Born: David Allenby Booth; 1 August 1938 (age 88); England
- Education: University of Oxford
- Known for: individual psychology, associative learning of appetites (conditioned satiety), neuroscience of motivation, weight control, retail product choices (consumer behaviour)
- Scientific career
- Fields: Psychology
- Workplaces: University of Sussex
- Website: birmingham.ac.uk > booth-david Archived

David A. Booth is a British research psychologist.

David Allenby Booth (born 1938) works full-time in research as an honorary professor at the School of Psychology in the Faculty of Science, Engineering and Medicine of the University of Sussex (UK). According to his Web page he investigates the ways in which an individual's life works. His research centres on the processes in the mind that fit acts and reactions of human beings and animals to the passing situation.

== Work ==
Early work by David Booth refuted the theory that dual centres of the hypothalamus control eating, the lateral hypothalamus for hunger and the ventromedial hypothalamus for satiety and began to replace it with a theory of the control of food choice and intake through learnt connections distributed around the brain. With colleagues he built a simulation of the physiological and learning mechanisms influencing eating patterns in people and laboratory animals, and extended it to include cultural and interpersonal influences. This approach was generalised to identify and measure the causal processes by which an individual intelligence transforms incoming to outgoing social and material information during an action.[9]
