= Sensory-specific satiety =

Relationship of flavor to hunger

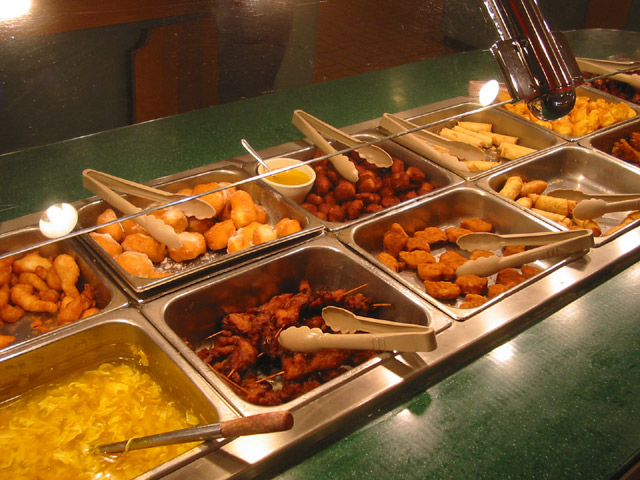
Sensory-specific satiety is illustrated when diners at a buffet eat a larger quantity of food than those eating a single dish, even when the single dish is provided in quantities as much as the diner desires.

Sensory specific satiety is a phenomenon that refers to the declining satisfaction generated by the consumption of a certain type of food, and the consequent renewal in appetite resulting from the exposure to a new flavour or food. The energy density and nutrient composition of foods has little effect on sensory-specific satiety.

The sensory hedonic phenomenon was first described in 1956 by the French physiologist Jacques Le Magnen. The term "sensory specific satiety" was coined in 1981 by Barbara J. Rolls and Edmund T. Rolls. The concept illustrates the role of physical stimuli in generating appetite and, more specifically, explains the significance of taste, or food flavour in relation to hunger. Besides conditioned satiety and alimentary alliesthesia, it is one of the three major phenomena of satiation. An Ingestive Classics paper on the topic has been written in conversation with Barbara J. Rolls.

== Studies ==
Sensory specific satiety is most commonly illustrated in the laboratory setting by offering participants a first course, as much as the participant desires. Then after a short interval offering a second course or access to a standard buffet. After eating a first course consisting of one food, participants are less likely to select that food again if offered the same food in a second course, or to select this food again from an array presented in a buffet. The more variety offered, the more people will eat. Thus, a larger amount of food will be eaten at a buffet because the variety of foods and flavors presented renews the desire to eat (appetite) in the individual.

A study conducted by Rolls and van Duijvenvoorde in 1984 verified this process by simulating a buffet-style meal. They fed participants four courses of the same food or four courses of different foods which included sausages, bread and butter, chocolate dessert, and bananas. The results revealed a 44% increase in overall food consumption when exposed to the meals with a variety of foods.

Postingestive feedback factors such as energy density and nutrient composition was theorized to affect the palatability of a food, which in turn would inhibit or facilitate sensory specific satiety. However, studies done by Birch & Deysher (1986) and B.J. Rolls et al., summarized in a paper by Raynor and Epstein, show that postingesitive feedback does not influence sensory specific satiety. Since postingestive feedback seems to have little effect on the expression of sensory specific satiety, it is probable that sensory specific satiety is more driven by external factors, such as the sensory properties of the food, than internal factors. In other words, the study suggested that energy density and nutrient composition of foods has little effect on sensory-specific satiety.

== In relation to obesity ==
Studies have shown that eating a limited variety of foods can result in monotony effects, which some have termed "long-term sensory-specific satiety". By continuing to eat similar meals, a dieter can reduce their overall food intake and use sensory specific satiety as a tool for weight loss. In contrast, eating a large variety of foods is thought to be a driver of overconsumption with potential links to obesity because of the stimulation of appetite from diverse foods. Foods which are high in energy density do not produce a greater level of sensory specific satiety than foods which are low in energy density.

== In relation to age ==
Sensory specific satiety varies depending on age, with older adults experiencing decreased sensory specific satiety and adolescents experiencing enhanced effects. In a study focusing on age in sensory specific satiety, it was hypothesized that the degree of sensory specific satiety is affected by age due to the slow sensory loss experienced by people as they age. It was predicted that due to sensory impairment with ageing, older people might tend towards consuming a monotonous diet since foods are experienced as less pleasantness resulting from blunted sensory acuity. However, it was shown that the decline in sensory specific satiety observed in ageing was not linked to sensory loss; instead, there is an unclear cognitive process that relates to decline in sensory specific satiety that may reflect an overall desire in appetite with ageing compared to adolescents.

== See also ==
- Specific appetite
