= Added sugar =

Caloric sweeteners added to food and beverages

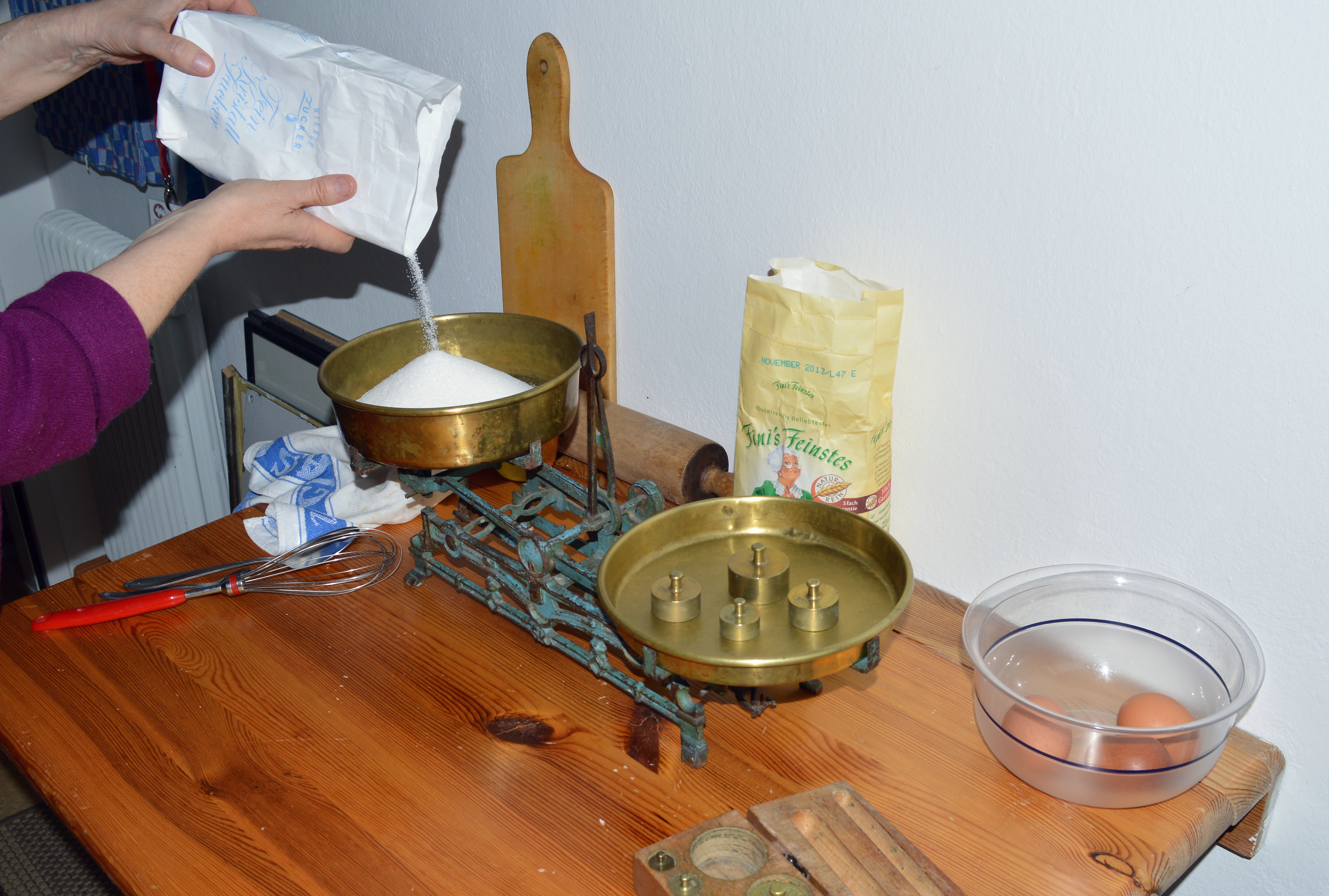
White sugar being weighed for a cake

Added sugar or free sugar refers to sugar that is added to food and drinks in processing or preparation, as opposed to natural sugars present prior to processing and preparation. Medical consensus holds that added sugars contribute little nutritional value to food. It is sometimes described colloquially as empty calories. Sugar overconsumption is correlated with excessive calorie intake and increased risk of weight gain and various diseases.

Individuals who consume 17–21% of their daily calories from added sugar are reported to have a 38% higher risk of dying from cardiovascular disease compared to those who consume 8% of their daily calories from added sugar.

== Uses ==
=== United States ===
In the United States, added sugars may include sucrose or high-fructose corn syrup, both primarily composed of about half glucose and half fructose. Other types of added sugar ingredients include beet and cane sugars, malt syrup, maple syrup, pancake syrup, fructose sweetener, liquid fructose, fruit juice concentrate, honey, and molasses. The most common types of foods containing added sugars are sweetened beverages, including most soft drinks, and also desserts and sweet snacks, which represent 20% of daily calorie consumption, twice the maximum limit recommended by the World Health Organization (WHO). Based on a 2012 study on the use of caloric and noncaloric sweeteners in some 85,000 food and beverage products, 74% of the products contained added sugar.

=== Sweetened beverages ===
Sweetened beverages contain a syrup mixture of the monosaccharides glucose and fructose formed by hydrolytic saccharification of the disaccharide sucrose. The bioavailability of liquid carbohydrates is higher than in solid sugars, as characterized by sugar type and by the estimated rate of digestion. There is evidence for a positive and causal relationship between excessive intake of fruit juices and increased risk of some chronic metabolic diseases.

== Guidelines ==
=== World Health Organization ===
In 2003, the WHO defined free sugars principally by defining the term "carbohydrate" into elements that relate more directly to the impact on health rather than a chemical definition, and followed on from meta-studies relating to chronic disease, obesity, and dental decay related to the overconsumption of high quantities of added sugar in processed foods. In tandem with the Food and Agriculture Organization, the WHO published a revised food pyramid that splits up the diet into more health-directed groups, recommending that a maximum of 10% of an individual's diet should come from free sugars. Sugar companies disputed the WHO report for suggesting that consumption of free sugars within the food pyramid should only amount to a daily maximum of 10%, and that there should be no minimum sugar intake.

In 2015, the WHO published a new guideline on sugar intake for adults and children as a result of an extensive review of the available scientific evidence by a multidisciplinary group of experts. The guideline recommends that both adults and children reduce the intake of free sugars to less than 10% of total energy intake.

=== Food and Drug Administration ===
In 2016, the US Food and Drug Administration revised its regulations for nutrition facts labelling, with the changes becoming mandatory by July 2018 in most cases. Among other changes, the revision requires labelling of "added sugars", using a daily value of 50 grams or 200 calories per day for a 2,000 calorie diet.

=== European Food Safety Authority ===
In February 2022, scientists of the European Food Safety Authority (EFSA) concluded that sugar consumption is a known cause of dental caries, and that evidence also links to consumption of sugar-sweetened beverages, juices and nectars with various chronic metabolic diseases including obesity, non-alcoholic fatty liver disease, and type 2 diabetes. EFSA stated: "We underlined there are uncertainties about chronic disease risk for people whose consumption of added and free sugars is below 10% of their total energy intake".

=== American Heart Association ===
In 2018, the American Heart Association recommended daily intake of sugar for men is 9 teaspoons or 36 grams (1.3 oz) per day, and for women, six teaspoons or 25 grams (0.88 oz) per day. Overconsumption of sugars in foods and beverages may increase the risk of several diseases.

== See also ==
- Diet and obesity
- Sugar substitute
- Sugary drink tax
