= Dietary energy supply =

Food energy available for human consumption

Map of dietary energy availability per person per day in 2001-2003

Map of dietary energy availability per person per day in 1989-1991

Map of dietary energy availability per person per day in 1979-1981

Energy values in kilocalories (kilojoules):
No data
<1600 (<6,700)
1600-1800 (6,700–7,500)
1800-2000 (7,500–8,400)
2000-2200 (8,400–9,200)
2200-2400 (9,200–10,000)
2400-2600 (10,000–10,900)
2600-2800 (10,900–11,700)
2800-3000 (11,700–12,600)
3000-3200 (12,600–13,400)
3200-3400 (13,400–14,200)
3400-3600 (14,200–15,100)
>3600 (>15,100)

The dietary energy supply is the food available for human consumption, usually expressed in kilocalories or kilojoules per person per day. It gives an overestimate of the total amount of food consumed as it reflects both food consumed and food wasted. It varies markedly between different regions and countries of the world. It has also changed significantly over the 21st century. Dietary energy supply is correlated with the rate of obesity.

== Regions ==
Daily dietary energy supply per capita:

Region	1964-1966	1974-1976	1984-1986	1997-1999
World	2,358 kcal (9,870 kJ)	2,435 kcal (10,190 kJ)	2,655 kcal (11,110 kJ)	2,803 kcal (11,730 kJ)
Sub-Saharan Africa	2,058 kcal (8,610 kJ)	2,079 kcal (8,700 kJ)	2,057 kcal (8,610 kJ)	2,195 kcal (9,180 kJ)

== Countries ==
Country	1979-1981	1989-1991	2001-2003
Canada	2,930 kcal (12,300 kJ)	3,030 kcal (12,700 kJ)	3,590 kcal (15,000 kJ)
China	2,330 kcal (9,700 kJ)	2,680 kcal (11,200 kJ)	2,940 kcal (12,300 kJ)
Eswatini	2,400 kcal (10,000 kJ)	2,450 kcal (10,300 kJ)	2,360 kcal (9,900 kJ)
United Kingdom	3,170 kcal (13,300 kJ)	3,250 kcal (13,600 kJ)	3,440 kcal (14,400 kJ)
United States	3,180 kcal (13,300 kJ)	3,460 kcal (14,500 kJ)	3,770 kcal (15,800 kJ)

== See also ==
- Diet and obesity

Average dietary energy supply by region
