= Nutrition psychology =

Study of how choices influence nutrition and health

Nutrition psychology is the psychological study of the relationship between dietary intake and different aspects of psychological health. It is an applied field that uses an interdisciplinary approach to examine the influence of diet on mental health. Nutrition psychology seeks to understand the relationship between nutritional behavior, mental health and general well-being. It is a sub-field of psychology and more specifically of health psychology, and may be applied to numerous related fields, including psychology, dietetics, nutrition, and marketing.

Nutrition psychology assesses how nutrition affects psychological functions, and how psychological choices and behavior influence nutrition and health.

== Description ==
Nutrition psychology addresses dietary quality and its relation to various components of mental health.

== Origins and development ==
Nutrition psychology is a field that is still in its early stages of development. Despite the growing interest and demand for nutrition psychology, there is a lack of research studies on this topic. Expanding the field will require a proliferation of peer-reviewed research. Recent studies suggest that probiotics and prebiotics may support mental well-being by promoting a balanced gut microbiota. These dietary components help regulate inflammation and neurotransmitter activity, which are linked to mood and cognitive function.

With obesity being a continually growing problem in many countries, nutrition psychology is gaining importance and popularity in society today. As it has grown, nutrition psychology has directly and indirectly influenced research on dieting, food labels, the way food is marketed, food technology, obesity, and the attitude of the public towards food, among other topics.

Some research discusses the idea of "food faddism", which is loosely defined as, "the idea that too much weight is put upon the influence of food and diet on overall health and that claims, whether good or bad, are often exaggerated." This idea of food choices having extreme consequences is thought to be deeply ingrained into culture, possibly stemming from the story of Adam and Eve eating the forbidden fruit.

== Applications ==
=== Food labels ===
In 1990, the U.S. Food and Drug Administration (FDA) required that nutrition labels be put on food products in the United States. The thought behind doing so was to provide consumers with the necessary information to make educated decisions about the foods that they purchased. Since that time, nutrition psychologists have done research on how these labels influence how consumers choose what foods to buy. These studies have shown mixed results concerning the effects of nutritional labeling. According to the research, the average consumer does tend to read the labels and take the information into consideration, in part because companies have begun producing foods with more health-conscious ingredients. However, many of these potential health benefits are overshadowed by the continuing increase in obesity and deaths related to obesity in the United States over the last few decades.

Because of the misinformation and easy access to processed and prepackaged foods, people are more likely to choose them over fresh food or healthier packaged foods. That can lead to health-related diseases and obesity. Those that are uneducated on the topic of nutrition and how to read nutrition labels are the most at risk for this. When informed on nutrition labeling, there is an impact on one's health, body weight, and overall energy intake. Many food companies market their food products to make them seem more nutritious than they actually are, falsely leading people to believe that they are a healthy option. That can link to obesity because some may be intaking a large amount of a product they think is a healthy option. They can do that by making the product packaging look a certain way, or putting misleading words on them. For example, people may have more incentive to buy a product if the packaging looks nicer and is colorful or has pictures on it. Also, false claims can be made on the packaging such as made with real ingredients, boosts immunity, no high-fructose corn syrup, or lowers cholesterol. In reality, the food items have processed ingredients, these claims are not true, and it does not mean the other ingredients are healthy. Food companies will also say their product has nutritional benefits that others do not, just to get consumers to buy theirs. Many people would like to be more knowledgeable about nutrition labeling. However, it is hard for some when they have to compare many different components they don't want like sugar, cholesterol, sodium, or fat. It is easier for those with background knowledge or interest in nutrition to determine labels.

=== Marketing ===
As with any industry, marketing plays an important role in the buying and selling of food products. Marketing campaigns for food and beverages are increasingly prevalent today and are larger in scope than ever before, given the resources that large corporations are able to use in the forms of social media and viral marketing. Some researchers claim that the dramatic rise in obesity rates are at least in part, due to an increase in the marketing of food over the past 30 years. New marketing strategies have taken many forms, including changing the packaging of the food or beverage itself, product placement in media, advertisements in schools, increased focus on "value meals" with larger portions, and endorsements by athletes or celebrities. Many of these methods increase exposure to younger consumers, who studies show tend to be more impressionable than adults and whose eating patterns as children can continue long into their adult lives. There are calls for junk food television advertisements to be banned before 9.00 pm to prevent children seeing them.

=== Food technology ===
Recently, food has been a source of technological development. Nutrition psychologists have studied the public's perception of food technology such as genetic modification or additives that may extend the shelf life of food, among other topics. In general, the findings show that the average consumer is more likely to avoid food that is affected by technology and will prefer organic, all-natural choices. These technological effects are often perceived by consumers to pose health risks, even if those claims are not founded in facts.

=== Fad diets ===
Nutrition psychology has many applications not only related to how and what people eat on a day-to-day basis, but also the ways in which and why they diet and exercise. Fad diets are popular in today's society and they usually play heavily on potential customers' ideals about what they should weigh or look like. These diets usually include an extreme condition or restriction on a person's particular food intake that supposedly will result in weight loss. People become attracted to these weight loss claims because of the potential ease with which the weight loss can happen. However, these claims are not always founded in scientific research.

=== Nutritional psychiatry ===
Nutritional psychiatry is the emerging scientific field dedicated to exploring the relationship between the effects of diet and mental health. There is ongoing research about how poor diets directly influence the development of cognitive decline, as well as symptoms of psychiatric conditions, such as ADHD, depression, inflammation, anxiety, bipolar disorder, and schizophrenia. There is also research about how specific diets, those that focus on maintaining balanced nutrition, could be potential avenues for treatment of mental health conditions. A healthy diet provides the necessary micro and macronutrients that serve as the building blocks for curating stable mental health.

==== Depression ====
Depression is a mood disorder that negatively impact peoples' thoughts, feelings, and behaviors. According to the American Psychiatric Association "1 in 6 people will be diagnosed with depression in their lifetime". Considering its negative consequences and prevalence interventions to manage this condition are important. Recent research has demonstrated that dietary interventions can be used as part of treatment plan for depression. Engaging in healthful dietary behaviors such as adhering to dietary recommendations, consuming an anti-inflammatory diet, eating fish, avoiding processed food, and obtaining adequate vitamins and minerals were associated with a reduced risk of depression. In another study, researchers found that diets high in fruits, vegetables, whole grains, fish, olive oil, low fat dairy products, and antioxidants were also associated with a reduced risk of depression.

==== Anxiety ====
According to the American Psychological Association anxiety is an emotion characterized by feelings of tension, worried thoughts, and physical behaviors. Anxiety disorders are the most common form of mental disorders. While there are a multitude of options available to treat anxiety disorders nutritional interventions are one avenue that has been shown to be useful. The scientific literature has demonstrated that antioxidant consumption, adequate protein, and higher levels of vitamin B-6 can help lessen symptoms of anxiety. Conversely, diets high in fat and refined sugars have been associated with increased levels of anxiety.

==== ADHD ====
Attention-deficit/hyperactivity disorder or ADHD is a neurodevelopment disorder that is characterized by trouble paying attention, difficulty controlling impulsive behaviors, and/or hyperactivity. Recent findings in the field of nutritional psychology have shown that nutritional interventions can help to manage symptoms of ADHD. A literature review found that the administration of micronutrients, fatty acids, or probiotics are not beneficial. However, the elimination of certain foods, tailored to the individuals intolerances, can help manage symptoms in children and adolescents. While intake of certain food items are beneficial for people with ADHD a high intake of refined sugars and saturated fat can worsen symptoms of ADHD.

=== Cognition ===
As individuals age they experience declines in some aspects of cognitive functioning including thinking speed, multitasking, and remembering information. Engaging in healthful dietary practices has been shown to reduce some of the cognitive declines that come with aging. For example, diets high in antioxidants, olive oil, and nuts have been shown to reduce various aspects of cognitive decline. Low levels of protein can also cause mild cognitive impairment. In contrast, having high levels of certain macronutrients can also lead to mild cognitive decline. For example, high levels of protein and fat intake can cause issues as one begins to age. However, having adequate amounts of macronutrient intake can lead to feelings of satisfaction when it comes to focus and concentration.

== In popular culture ==
The 2004 documentary film, Super Size Me, directed by and starring Morgan Spurlock focuses on the ways in which the fast food industry in America is influencing how people and especially young children, view nutrition.

== See also ==
- Health psychology
- Nutrition and cognition
- Fad diet
- Healthy Diet
- Obesity
- Center for Nutrition Policy and Promotion
- Genetically modified food controversies
- Dieting
- Nutrition label
