= Protein leverage hypothesis =

Dietary theory centred around protein consumption

The protein leverage hypothesis states that human beings will prioritize the consumption of protein in food over other dietary components, and will eat until protein needs have been met, regardless of energy content, thus leading to over-consumption of foodstuffs when their protein content is low.

This hypothesis has been put forward as a potential explanation of the obesity epidemic. Empirical tests have provided some evidence to confirm the hypothesis with one study suggesting that this could be a link between ultra-processed foods and the prevalence of obesity in the developed world.

In the 1980s, David Raubenheimer and Stephen Simpson, researchers now at the University of Sydney, began to study appetite and food intake in locusts. By studying responses to artificial diets with differing compositions of protein and carbohydrate, they developed the protein leverage hypothesis. Their experiments showed that those who aren't getting enough protein in their diet will continue to be hungry, even when their overall caloric intake is high. "Protein decoys", such as ultraprocessed savory foods that contain little protein (e.g., barbecue chips), are likely to be attractive and to result in overeating. The hormone FGF21, which is released from the liver, can drive savory-seeking behavior under conditions of low protein intake. However, extremely high protein diets can also have drawbacks. In 2020 Simpson and Raubenheimer published the popular science book Eat Like the Animals: What Nature Teaches Us about the Science of Healthy Eating, which details their experiments. For lifelong health they recommend eating a balanced diet with more fiber and fewer fats and carbohydrates rather than an extremely high protein diet.

In 1995, Australian researcher Susanna Holt developed the concept of satiety value, a measure of how much a given food is likely to satisfy the hunger of someone. High protein foods have been found to have high satiety values, though these are outmatched by potatoes and oats (which have a low glycemic index). Fruits rank similarly to high protein foods (likely due to their high level of dietary fibre).
