= Alliesthesia =

Alliesthesia (from Ancient Greek: ἀλλοῖος, romanized: alloios – be changed, and αἴσθησις (aísthēsis) – sensation, perception; thus "changed sensation"; French: alliesthésie, German: Alliästhesie) is a psychophysiological phenomenon (not to be confused with the pathologic symptom of allesthesia) that describes the dependence of perceived pleasure or displeasure of stimuli on the internal state of an organism. The internal state of an organism is in constant change, and any stimulus that can help to correct an error or to satisfy a need will be pleasantly perceived. For example, food will be more pleasant when hungry compared to when an organism is satiated. The sensation aroused therefore depends not only on the quality or on the intensity of the stimulus, but also on the internal state of the organism as sensed by internal receptors. The relationship between the perceptual system and physiology is subjective and studied by psychophysics.

== Forms ==
- thermal alliesthesia: alliesthesia of the thermic perception (heat and cold), which contributes fundamentally to homeostatic thermoregulation. It is an aspect of thermal comfort.
- olfactory alliesthesia: alliesthesia of olfaction (sense of smell)
- gustatory alliesthesia: alliesthesia of taste – described for certain primary tastes (sweet and salty)
- olfacto-gustatory alliesthesia or alimentary alliesthesia: alliesthesia of tastes/flavors pertaining to food intake
- visual/optic alliesthesia: alliesthesia of vision
- auditory alliesthesia: alliesthesia of the sense of hearing

Each of these forms of alliesthesia exists in two opposite tendencies:

- negative alliesthesia: shift of sensation from pleasure to displeasure.
- positive alliesthesia: shift of sensation from displeasure to pleasure.

== Evidence ==
The phenomenon of alliesthesia was first described by the French physiologist Michel Cabanac. The first scientific publication from 1968 was succeeded by over 40 publications in international journals, for example: 1970 in Nature and 1971 in Science. The term alliesthesia was first mentioned in the annex of Physiological Role of Pleasure and was further elaborated in collaboration with the coauthor Stylianos Nicolaïdis. Originally, alliesthesia was demonstrated in experiments with human subjects, and later confirmed in rats (Rattus norvegicus).
