= Satiety value =

Degree at which food gives a human the feeling of satiety per calorie

Satiety value is the degree at which food gives a human the feeling of satiety per calorie. The concept of the Satiety Value and Satiety Index was developed by Australian researcher and doctor, Susanna Holt. Highest satiety value is expected when the food that remains in the stomach for a longer period produces greatest functional activity of the organ.

Foods with the most satiation per calorie are often:

- high in certain proteinase inhibitors that suppress appetite - e.g. potatoes
- solid (which takes longer to digest than liquid foods, though liquids have high satiety for a short period)

The protein leverage hypothesis posits that human beings will prioritize the consumption of protein in food over other dietary components, and will eat until protein needs have been met, regardless of energy content, thus leading of over-consumption of foodstuffs when their protein content is low.

Sugar-sweetened beverages showed lower satiety compared to isocaloric semi-skimmed milk.

Alcoholic beverages tend to have a lower satiety per calorie.

Fruit juice with and without pulp was shown to result in lower satiety than comparable amounts of fruits.

== List ==
In the table below, glycemic and insulin scores show the increase in the blood concentration of each. The Insulin Index is not the same as a glycemic index (GI), which is based exclusively on the digestible carbohydrate content of food, and represents a comparison of foods in amounts with equal digestible carbohydrate content (typically 50 g). The insulin index compares foods in amounts with equal overall caloric content (240 kcal or 1000 kJ). Insulin indexes are scaled relative to white bread, while glycemic index scores nowadays are usually scaled with respect to pure glucose, although in the past white bread has been a reference point for GI measurements as well. A higher satiety value indicates increase of satiety after eating a serving of equal overall caloric content, scaled relative to white bread.

Mean average glucose, insulin and satiety scores
Food	Food Type	Glycemic score	Insulin score	Satiety value
All-Bran	Breakfast cereal	40 ± 7	32 ± 4	151
Porridge	Breakfast cereal	60 ± 12	40 ± 4	209
Muesli	Breakfast cereal	43 ± 7	46 ± 5	100
Special K	Breakfast cereal	70 ± 9	66 ± 5	116
Honeysmacks	Breakfast cereal	60 ± 7	67 ± 6	132
Sustain	Breakfast cereal	66 ± 6	71 ± 6	112
Cornflakes	Breakfast cereal	76 ± 11	75 ± 8	118
Average:	Breakfast cereal	59 ± 3	57 ± 3	134
White bread (baseline)	Carbohydrate-rich	100 ± 0	100 ± 0	100
White pasta	Carbohydrate-rich	46 ± 10	40 ± 5	119
Brown pasta	Carbohydrate-rich	68 ± 10	40 ± 5	188
Grain bread	Carbohydrate-rich	60 ± 12	56 ± 6	154
Brown rice	Carbohydrate-rich	104 ± 18	62 ± 11	132
French fries	Carbohydrate-rich	71 ± 16	74 ± 12	116
White rice	Carbohydrate-rich	110 ± 15	79 ± 12	138
Whole-meal bread (Note: Bread made from whole-meal wheat flour, Holt et al.)	Carbohydrate-rich	97 ± 17	96 ± 12	157
Potatoes	Carbohydrate-rich	141 ± 35	121 ± 11	323
Average:	Carbohydrate-rich	88 ± 6	74 ± 8	158.6
Eggs	Protein-rich	42 ± 16	31 ± 6	150
Cheese	Protein-rich	55 ± 18	45 ± 13	146
Beef	Protein-rich	21 ± 8	51 ± 16	176
Lentils in tomato sauce	Protein-rich	62 ± 22	58 ± 12	133
Fish	Protein-rich	28 ± 13	59 ± 18	225
Baked beans in tomato sauce	Protein-rich	114 ± 18	120 ± 19	168
Average:	Protein-rich	54 ± 7	61 ± 7	166.3
Apples	Fruit	50 ± 6	59 ± 4	197
Oranges	Fruit	39 ± 7	60 ± 3	202
Bananas	Fruit	79 ± 10	81 ± 5	118
Grapes	Fruit	74 ± 9	82 ± 6	162
Average:	Fruit	61 ± 5	71 ± 3	169.75
Peanuts	Snack/confectionery	12 ± 4	20 ± 5	84
Popcorn	Snack/confectionery	62 ± 16	54 ± 9	154
Potato chips	Snack/confectionery	52 ± 9	61 ± 14	91
Ice cream	Snack/confectionery	70 ± 19	89 ± 13	96
Low Fat Strawberry Yogurt	Snack/confectionery	62 ± 15	115 ± 13	88
Mars Bars	Snack/confectionery	79 ± 13	122 ± 15	70
Jellybeans	Snack/confectionery	118 ± 18	160 ± 16	118 (Note: the authors of the satiety study stated that the amount of jellybeans consumed tended to make participants nauseated which may have produced an erroneous satiety value.)
Average:	Snack/confectionery	65 ± 6	89 ± 7	100.1
Doughnuts	Bakery product	63 ± 12	74 ± 9	68
Croissants	Bakery product	74 ± 9	79 ± 14	47
Cake	Bakery product	56 ± 14	82 ± 12	65
Crackers	Bakery product	118 ± 24	87 ± 12	127
Cookies	Bakery product	74 ± 11	92 ± 15	120
Average:	Bakery product	77 ± 7	83 ± 5	85.4
Average:	Average	67.333 ± 5.7	72.5 ± 6	135.7
Average:	ALL	68.8 ± 12.7105	72 ± 9.5	136

== See also ==
- A calorie is a calorie
- Energy homeostasis
- Expected satiety
- Gastric inhibitory polypeptide
- Ghrelin
- Glucagon-like peptide-1 (GLP-1)
- Incretin
- Protein leverage hypothesis
- Polyphagia
- Sugary drink tax
- Visual analogue scale
- Weight gain
