= Cultural environmentalism =

Movement that seeks to protect the public domain

Cultural environmentalism is the movement that seeks to protect the public domain. The term was coined by James Boyle, professor at Duke University and contributor to the Financial Times.

The term stems from Boyle's argument that those who seek to protect the public domain are working towards a similar ends as environmentalists. Boyle's contention is that whereas the environmentalist movement illuminated the effects that social decisions can have upon ecology, cultural environmentalists seek to illuminate the effects that intellectual property laws can have upon culture.
