= Serving size =

Amount of a food or drink that is typically served

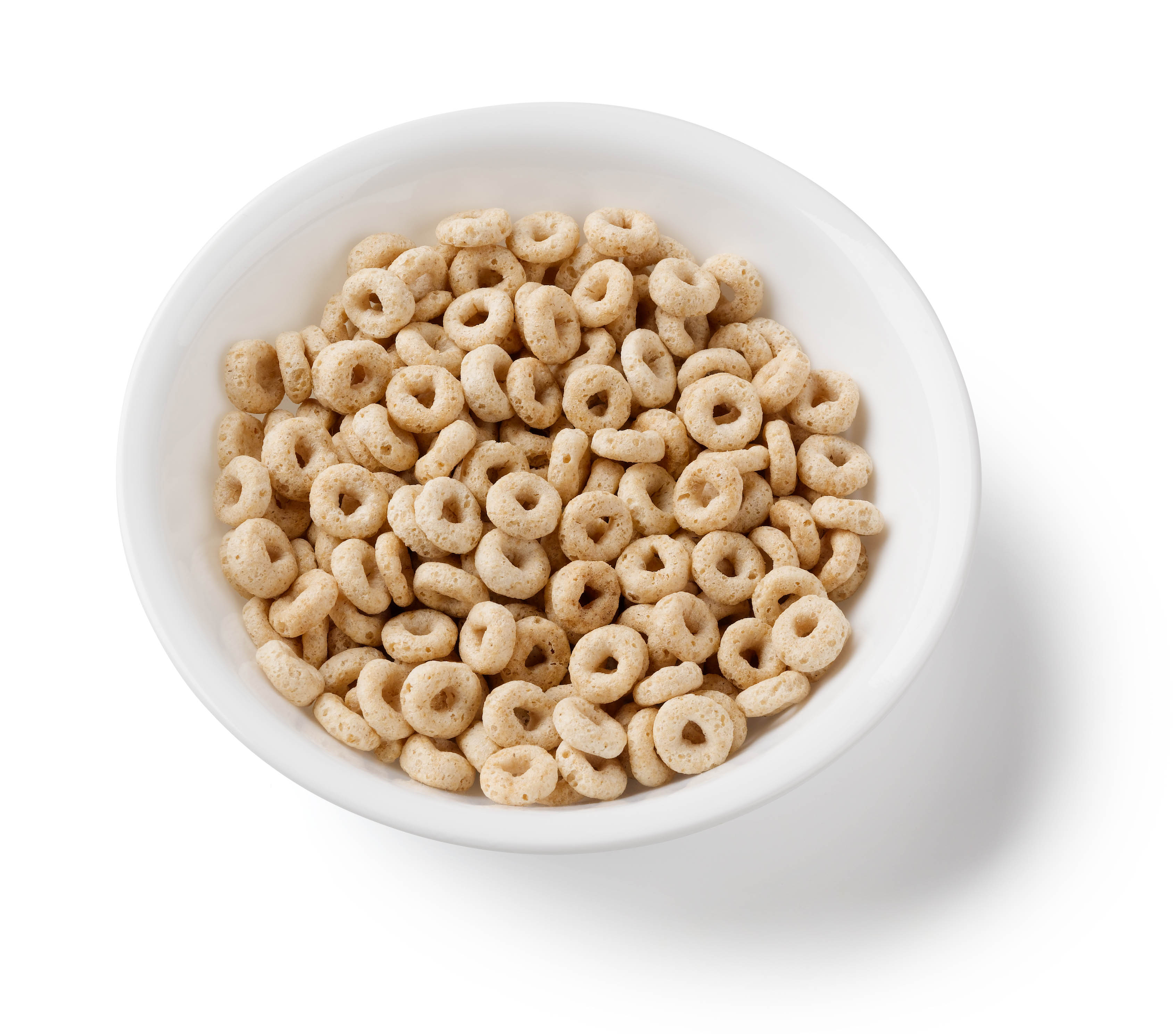
3/4 of a cup of Cheerios cereal is considered to be a single serving of grains by the United States Department of Agriculture

A serving size or portion size is the amount of a food or drink that is generally served.

A distinction is made between a portion size as determined by an external agent, such as a food manufacturer, chef, or restaurant, and a "self selected portion size" in which an individual has control over the portion in a meal or snack. Self-selected portion size is determined by several factors such as the palatability of a food and the extent to which it is expected to reduce hunger and to generate fullness.

== Measurement ==
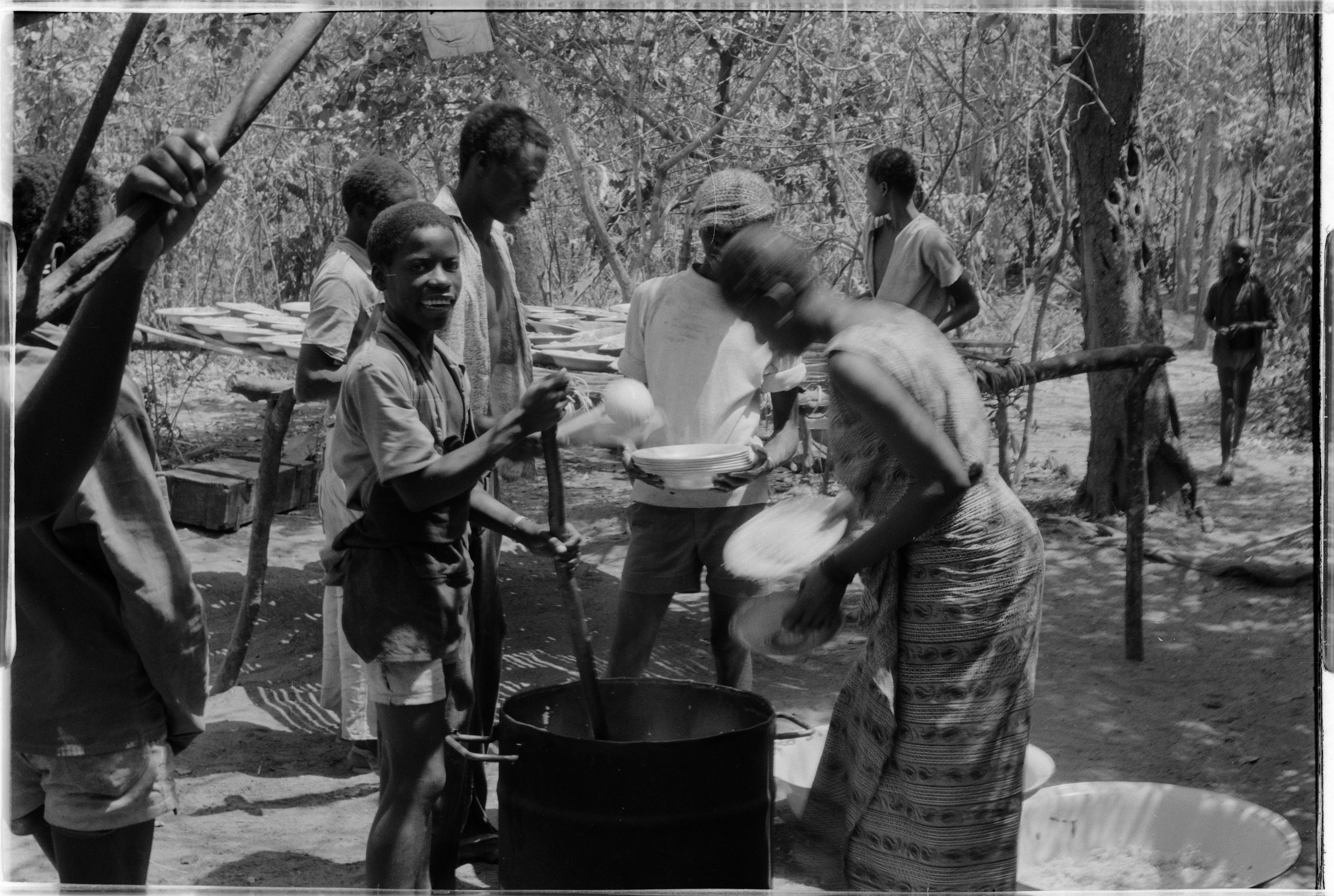
Dividing the cooked food in portions for a group meal. Campada, Guinea-Bissau, 1974.

Bulk products, such as sugar, generally have sizes in common units of measurement, such as the cup or tablespoon. Commonly divided products, such as pie or cake, have a serving size given in a fraction of the whole product (e.g. 1/8 cake). Products which are sliced beforehand or are bought in distinct, grouped units (e.g. olives), are listed in the approximate number of units corresponding to the reference amount. For example, if the reference amount for olives were 30 g, and one olive weighed 10 g, the serving size would probably be listed as "3 olives".

== Health effects ==
In 2017, in the United Kingdom and Netherlands in particular, it was not clear if controlling the serving size (called "portion control") was an effective way to change the amount of food or drink that people consume. However evidence from a systematic review of 72 randomized controlled trials indicates that people consistently eat more food when offered larger portion, package, or tableware sizes rather than smaller size alternatives.

== United States ==
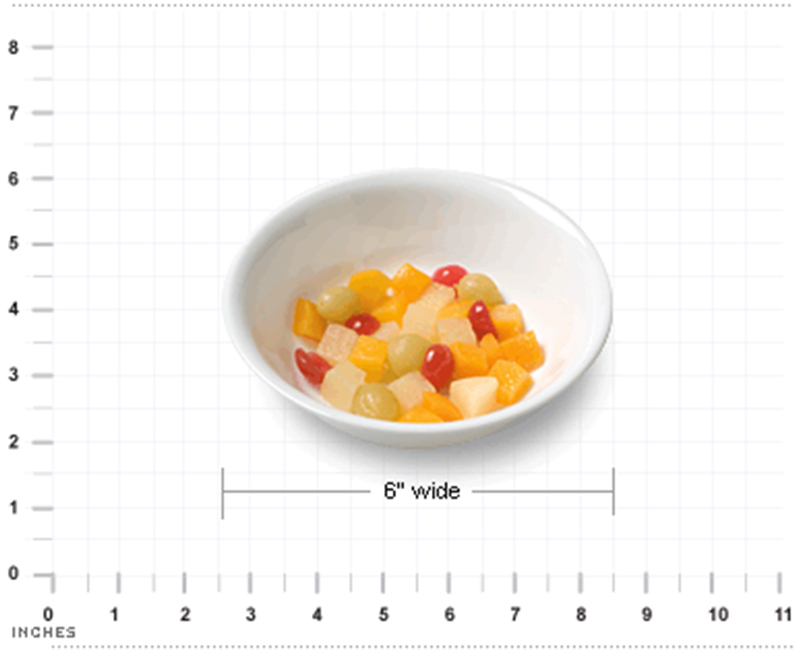
A half-cup portion of commercially prepared fruit cocktail

Serving sizes are found on both the Food Pyramid and its successor program MyPlate as well as nutrition labels, and has two related but differing meanings. The USDA Center for Nutrition Policy and Promotion sets the standards for My Plate and related guidelines. The FDA defines the "Reference Amounts Customarily Consumed" (RACC) tables used by food manufacturers to determine the serving size on the Nutrition Facts Panel, and the USDA Food Safety and Inspection Services labels. Alcoholic beverages above 0.5% ABV are regulated by the Alcohol and Tobacco Tax and Trade Bureau (TTB) not the FDA and are allowed different serving sizes than FDA's RACC tables.

The nutrition facts label is designed to give consumers important nutritional information about a product and allow comparisons with other food. The serving size indicates the amount of food for which the nutrition information is shown. RACCs were established by regulation in 1993 in response to the Nutrition Labeling and Education Act and were based on how much food people typically eat, balanced with desired portion size. Ice cream is the classic example where the RACC is 1/2 cup, but people more often consume more.

From 1996 to 2016, there was an increase in the serving sizes of food. For example, in 2016 the average muffin in America is 130 grams, but 20 years before the serving size was 85 grams. Another example is the bagel, for which the diameter and calories have both doubled over the same 20 years. Other foods that have doubled in calories include American staples of spaghetti with meatballs and cheeseburgers. Furthermore, a serving of French fries and a can of soda tripled their calories and serving size. Between 1960 and 2000, the size of bagels and muffins doubled. As food portions increased over time, "unit bias" has also increased. This means that people think that a portion size equals one serving size of a food or meal. This idea of "unit bias" is important in restaurants because customers often think that what they are being served is one serving of a food group or meal, but it may be way more than originally thought.

The United States FDA recommends in their "2015-2020 Dietary Guidelines" that an American adult eating 2,000 calories a day should be consuming 2.5 cups of vegetables, 2 cups of fruit, 6 ounces of grain, 3 cups of dairy, 5.5 ounces of protein, and 27 grams of oils every day.

== See also ==
- Expected satiety
