= Food choice =

Study of how people select the food they eat

Research into food choice investigates how people select the food they eat. An interdisciplinary topic, food choice comprises psychological and sociological aspects (including food politics and phenomena such as vegetarianism or religious dietary laws), economic issues (for instance, how food prices or marketing campaigns influence choice) and sensory aspects (such as the study of the organoleptic qualities of food).

Factors that guide food choice include taste preference, sensory attributes, cost, availability, convenience, cognitive restraint, and cultural familiarity. In addition, environmental cues and increased portion sizes play a role in the choice and amount of foods consumed.

Food choice is the subject of research in nutrition, food science, food psychology, anthropology, sociology, and other branches of the natural and social sciences. It is of practical interest to the food industry and especially its marketing endeavors. Social scientists have developed different conceptual frameworks of food choice behavior. Theoretical models of behavior incorporate both individual and environmental factors affecting the formation or modification of behaviors. Social cognitive theory examines the interaction of environmental, personal, and behavioral factors.

== Taste preference ==
Researchers have found that consumers cite taste as the primary determinant of food choice. Genetic differences in the ability to perceive bitter taste are believed to play a role in the willingness to eat bitter-tasting vegetables and in the preferences for sweet taste and fat content of foods. Approximately 25 percent of the US population are supertasters and 50 percent are tasters. Epidemiological studies suggest that nontasters are more likely to eat a wider variety of foods and to have a higher body mass index (BMI), a measure of weight in kilograms divided by height in meters squared.

== Environmental influences ==
Many environmental cues influence food choice and intake, although consumers may not be aware of their effects (see mindless eating). Examples of environmental influences include portion size, serving aids, food variety, and ambient characteristics (discussed below).

=== Portion size ===
Portion sizes in the United States have increased markedly in the past several decades. For example, from 1977 to 1996, portion sizes increased by 60 percent for salty snacks and 52 percent for soft drinks. Importantly, larger product portion sizes and larger servings in restaurants and kitchens consistently increase food intake. Larger portion sizes may even cause people to eat more of foods that are ostensibly distasteful; in one study individuals ate significantly more stale, two-week-old popcorn when it was served in a large versus a medium-sized container.

=== Serving aids ===
Over 70 percent of one's total intake is consumed using serving aids such as plates, bowls, glasses, or utensils. Consequently, serving aids can act as visual cues or cognitive shortcuts that inform us of when to stop serving, eating, or drinking.

In one study, teenagers poured and consumed 74 percent more juice into short, wide glasses compared to tall, narrow glasses of the same volume. Similarly, veteran bartenders tend to pour 26 percent more liquor into short, wide glasses versus tall, narrow glasses. This may be explained in part by Piaget's vertical-horizontal illusion, in which people tend to focus on and overestimate an object's vertical dimension at the expense of its horizontal dimension, even when the two dimensions are identical in length.

In addition, larger bowls and spoons can also cause people to serve and consume a greater volume of food, although this effect may not also extend to larger plates. It has been suggested that people serve more food into larger dishes due to the Delboeuf illusion, a phenomenon in which two identical circles are perceived to be different in size depending upon the sizes of larger circles surrounding them.

Plate color has also been shown to influence perception and liking; in one study individuals perceived a dessert to be significantly more likable, sweet, and intense when it was served on a white versus a black plate.

=== Food variety ===
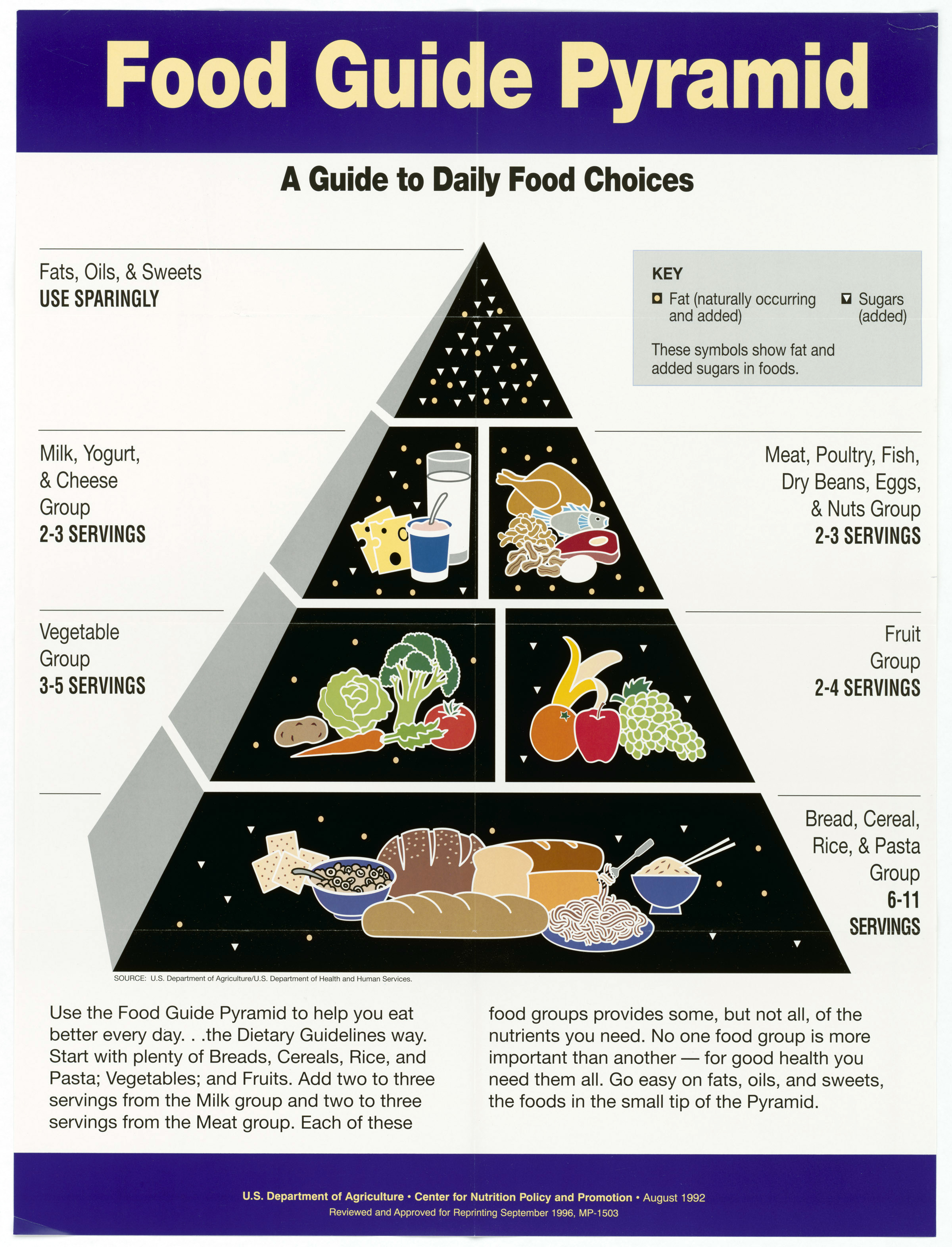
The Food Guide Pyramid.

As a given food is increasingly consumed, the hedonic pleasantness of the food's taste, smell, appearance, and texture declines, an effect commonly referred to as sensory-specific satiety. Consequently, increasing the variety of foods available can increase overall food intake. This effect has been observed across both genders and across multiple age groups, although there is some evidence that it may be most pronounced in adolescence and diminished among older adults.

Even the perceived variety of food can increase consumption; individuals consumed more M&M candies when they came in ten versus seven colors, despite identical taste. Furthermore, simply making a food assortment appear more disorganized versus organized can increase intake.

It has been suggested that this variety effect may be evolutionarily adaptive, as complete nutrition cannot be found in a single food, and increased dietary variety increases the likelihood of meeting nutritional requirements for various vitamins and minerals.

=== Ambient characteristics ===
==== Salience ====
There is a low grade evidence that changing the availability and positioning of food options may result in changes in food selection and consumption behaviours. Environmental interventions such as taxation, food-benefit programs, and increasing the availability of fruits can reduce the number of sweetened beverages consumption. Increased food salience in one's environment (including both food visibility and proximity) has been shown to increase consumption. Regarding visibility, food is consumed at a faster rate or at a greater volume when it is presented in clear versus opaque containers. Having large stockpiles of food products at home can increase their rate of consumption initially; however, after about a week's time the consumption rate may drop back down to the level of non-stockpiled foods, perhaps due to sensory-specific satiety. Salient foods may increase intake by serving as a continuous consumption reminder and increasing the number of food-related cognitive choices an individual must make. Additionally, some studies have found that obese individuals may be more susceptible to the influence of food salience and external cues than individuals with a normal-weight BMI.

==== Distractions ====
Distractions can increase food intake by initiating patterns of consumption, obscuring ability to accurately monitor consumption, and extending meal duration. For example, greater television viewing has been associated with increased meal frequency and caloric intake. A study in Australian children found that those who watched two or more hours of television per day were more likely to consume savory snacks and less likely to consume fruit compared to those who watched less television. Other distractors such as reading, movie watching, and listening to the radio have also been associated with increased consumption.

==== Temperature ====
Energy expenditure increases when ambient temperature is above or below the thermal neutral zone (the range of ambient temperature in which energy expenditure is not required for homeothermy). It has been suggested that energy intake also increases during conditions of extreme or prolonged cold temperatures. Relatedly, researchers have posited that reduced variability of ambient temperature indoors could be a mechanism driving obesity, as the percentage of US homes with air conditioning increased from 23 to 47 percent in recent decades. In addition, several human and animal studies have shown that temperatures above the thermoneutral zone significantly reduce food intake. However, overall there are few studies indicating altered energy intake in response to extreme ambient temperatures and the evidence is primarily anecdotal.

==== Lighting ====
There is a dearth of research investigating relationships between lighting and intake; however, extant literature suggests that harsh or glaring lighting promotes eating faster, whereas soft or warm lighting increases food intake by increasing comfort level, lowering inhibition, and extending meal duration.

==== Music ====
Compared to fast-tempo music, low-tempo music in a restaurant setting has been associated with longer meal duration and greater consumption of both food and drink, including alcoholic beverages. Similarly, when individuals hear preferred versus non-preferred music they tend to stay at dining establishments longer and spend more money on food and drink.

== Expert advice ==
In 2010, for the first time, the Dietary Guidelines for Americans (DGA) highlighted the role of the food environment in American food choices and recommended changes in the food environment to support individual behavior modification. The influence of environmental cues and other subtle factors have increased interest in using the principles of behavioral economics to change food behaviors.

== Social influences ==
=== Presence and behavior of others ===
There is a substantial amount of research indicating that the presence of others influences food intake (discussed below). In reviewing this literature, Herman, Roth, and Polivy have outlined three distinct effects:

1. Social facilitation – When eating in groups, people tend to eat more than they do when alone.

In daily diary studies, individuals have been found to eat from 30 to 40-50 percent more while in the presence of others versus eating alone. In fact, some research has indicated that the rate of intake is best described as a linear function of the number of people present, such that meals eaten with one, four, or seven other people were 33, 69, and 96 percent larger than meals eaten alone, respectively. In addition to these observational findings, there is also experimental evidence for social facilitation effects.

Meal duration may be an important factor in social facilitation effects; observational research has identified positive correlations between group size and meal duration, and further investigation has confirmed meal duration as a mediator of group size-intake relationships.

2. Modeling – When eating in the presence of others who consistently eat either a lot or a little, individuals tend to mirror this behavior by also eating either a lot or a little.

Early studies of modeling effects investigated food intake alone versus in the presence of others who either ate either a very small amount (1 cracker) or a larger amount (20-40 crackers). Findings were consistent, with individuals consuming more when paired with a high-consumption companion than a low-consumption companion, whereas eating alone was associated with an intermediate amount of intake. Research manipulating eating social norms within real-life actual friendships has also demonstrated modeling effects, as individuals ate less in the company of friends who had been instructed to restrict their intake versus those who had not been given these instructions. Furthermore, these modeling effects have been reported across a range of diverse demographics, affecting both normal-weight and overweight individuals, as well as both dieters and non-dieters. Finally, regardless of whether individuals are very hungry or very full, modeling effects remain very strong, suggesting that modeling may trump signals of hunger or satiety sent from the gut.

3. Impression management – When people eat in the presence of others who they perceive to be observing or evaluating them, they tend to eat less than they would otherwise eat alone.

Leary and Kowalski define impression management in general as the process by which individuals attempt to control the impressions others form of them. Previous research has shown that certain types of eating companions make people more or less eager to convey a good impression, and individuals often attempt to achieve this goal by eating less. For example, people who are eating in the presence of unfamiliar others during a job interview or first date tend to eat less.

In a series of studies by Mori, Chaiken and Pliner, individuals were given an opportunity to snack while getting acquainted with a stranger. In the first study, both males and females tended to eat less while in the presence of an opposite-sex eating companion, and for females this effect was most pronounced when the companion was most desirable. It also seems that women may consume less in order to exude a feminine identity; in a second study, women who were made to believe that a male companion viewed them as masculine ate less than women who believed they were perceived as feminine.

The weight of eating companions may also influence the volume of food consumed. Obese individuals have been found to eat significantly more in the presence of other obese individuals compared to normal-weight others, while normal-weight individuals' eating appears unaffected by the weight of eating companions.

Awareness Although the presence and behavior of others can have a strong impact on eating behavior, many individuals are not aware of these effects, and instead tend to attribute their eating behavior primarily to other factors such as hunger and taste. Relatedly, people tend to perceive factors like cost and health effects as significantly more influential than social norms in determining their own fruit and vegetable consumption.

=== Weight bias ===
Individuals who are overweight or obese may suffer from stigmatization or discrimination related to their weight, also called weightism or weight bias. There is emerging evidence that experiences with weight stigma may be a type of stereotype threat which leads to behavior consistent with the stereotype; for example, overweight and obese individuals ate more food after exposure to a weight stigmatizing condition. Additionally, in a study of over 2,400 overweight and obese women, 79 percent of women reported coping with weight stigma on multiple occasions by eating more food.

== Cognitive dietary restraint ==
Cognitive dietary restraint refers to the condition where one is constantly monitoring and attempting to restrict food intake in order to achieve or maintain a desired body weight. Strategies used by restrained eaters include choosing reduced-calorie and reduced-fat foods, in addition to restricting overall caloric intake. Individuals are classified as restrained eaters based on responses to validated questionnaires such as the Three Factor Eating Questionnaire and the restraint subscale of the Dutch Eating Behavior Questionnaire. Recent research suggests that the combination of restraint and disinhibition more accurately predict food choice than dietary restraint alone. Disinhibition is another factor measured by the Three Factor Eating Questionnaire. A positive score reflects a tendency towards overeating. Individuals scoring high on the disinhibition subscale eat in response to negative emotion, overeat when others are eating, and when in the presence of tasty or comfort foods.

== Gender differences ==
When it comes to selecting food, women are more likely than men to choose and consume foods based on health concerns or food contents. One possible explanation for this observed difference is women may be more concerned with body weight issues when choosing certain types of foods. There may be an inverse relationship, as adolescent girls are noted to have lower intakes of vitamins and minerals and ingest fewer fruits/vegetables and dairy foods than adolescent boys.

== Age differences ==
Across the lifespan, different eating habits can be observed based on socio-economic status, workforce conditions, financial security, and taste preference amongst other factors. A significant portion of middle-aged and older adults responded to choosing foods due to concerns with body-weight and heart disease, whereas adolescents select food without consideration of the impact on their health. Convenience, appeal of food (taste and appearance), and hunger and food cravings were found to be the greatest determinants of an adolescent's food choice. Food choice can change from an early to mature age as a result of a more sophisticated taste palate, income, and concerns about health and wellness.

== Socio-economic status ==
Income and level of education influence food choice via the availability of the resources to purchase a higher quality food and awareness of nutritious alternatives. Diet may vary depending on the availability of income to purchase more healthier, nutrient-rich foods. For a low-income family, pricing plays a larger role than taste and quality in whether the food will be purchased. This may partly explain the lower life expectancy of lower-income groups. Similarly, higher levels of education equate to higher expectations from functional foods and avoidance of food additives. Compared to conventional foods, organic foods have a higher cost and people may have limited access if generating a low income. The variety of foods carried in neighborhood stores may also influence diet ("food deserts").

== See also ==
- Agriculture
- Agribusiness
- Acquired taste
- Culinary art
- Food choice of older adults
- Food desert
- Food studies
- Gastronomy
- Nutrition
- Research into centenarians

== Selected bibliography ==
- Belasco, Warren (2008). Food: The Key Concepts. ISBN 978-1-84520-673-4.
- Frewer, Lynn; Einar Risvik; Hendrik Schifferstein (2001). Food, people, and society: a European perspective of consumers' food choices. ISBN 978-3-540-41521-3.
- Macbeth, Helen M. (1997). Food preferences and taste: continuity and change. ISBN 978-1-57181-958-1.
- Macclancy, Jeremy; C. Jeya Henry; Helen Macbeth (2009). Consuming the Inedible: Neglected Dimensions of Food Choice. ISBN 978-1-84545-684-9.
- Marshall, David (1995). Food choice and the consumer. ISBN 978-0-7514-0234-6.
- Meiselman, Herbert L.; H. J. H. MacFie (1996). Food choice, acceptance and consumption. ISBN 978-0-7514-0192-9.
- Shepherd, Richard; Monique Raats (2006). The psychology of food choice, Volume 3. ISBN 978-0-85199-032-3.
- McQuaid, John (2014). The Art and Science of What We Eat. ISBN 978-1-4516-8500-8.
