= Food marketing toward children =

Advertising of food products to children

The United States food and beverage industry has increased the amount of advertising that intensively and aggressively targets children through multiple channels. Food marketers know that youth consumers have equal if not more spending power than adults, they hold purchasing influence, and have the potential to be lifelong consumers. The advertisements for products predominantly high in sugar and fat have increased and have had an effect on the major health epidemic in the US of childhood obesity, and as such are inconsistent with national dietary recommendations. Food advertisements have moved from the television into the classroom. Marketing companies are exploring new creative techniques to reach their target audience, young children, through promotions, contests, and incentive programs. As a result, the US has progressively been placing regulations on how much advertising is allowed during children's programming.

== History of food marketing ==
Food marketing is thought to have three historical phases including the fragmentation phase taking place before 1870–1880, the unification phase from 1880 to 1950, and the segmentation phase including 1950 and later. Each phase can be distinguished by their profit margin ratio, the volume of food sold and the general characteristics of the era.

The fragmentation phase resulted in a high margin with low volume due to divided geographic locations across the United States with little opportunity for mass distribution. Most distribution was subsequently locally based. The unification phase resulted in low margins and high volume and was the time that companies including Heinz, Quaker Oats, and Coca-Cola were founded and distributed across the nation. Improvements in transportation allowed for national distribution through the use of railroads. The segmentation phase, the current phase, is also the most profitable. It also operates on a low margin with high volume.

With the advent of radio and television advertisements were able to have a farther, national reach. This allowed for food products and marketing to appeal to different demographics that were once not accessible. The segmentation phase also encapsulates the post-war era which had a large effect on food marketing. Along with this came the supermarket boom in the 1960s, growth in fast food, and the food wholesale market being dominated by large companies.

== Food advertising ==
Food advertisers are the second largest buyer of television, newspaper, magazine, billboard, and radio advertisements. To effectively reach the youth audience, marketers use multiple techniques and channels. Advertisers spend approximately $1 billion on television marketing that directly targets children and another $5 billion on other promotions. Online strategies are also well-developed. For example, cereal companies (the third largest food marketer to children) maintain websites that use branded techniques such as advergames, videos, site registration, and viral marketing proven successful in engaging children.

Development of brand relationships begins in early childhood. Marketers have done extensive research and have come to find that children between the ages of two and five hold a considerable amount of purchasing influence through what marketers have termed the "nag factor". Around the age of two a child will make their first request to buy a product, 75% of the time this will happen in a supermarket and 47% of the time it will be for a breakfast cereal (65% of the cereals requested are presweetened); 30% will be for snacks and beverages, 21% for toys, and 2% for other miscellaneous items.

At this age children are not capable of comprehending advertising and have little understanding of the intent that advertisers hold. Children do not begin to be able to understand advertising until about 7–8 years of age, and even at this age children's cognitive development is still not able to distinguish misleading advertising from others. By the time children reach 9–10 years of age they may possess the cognitive ability to understand and comprehend advertisements, but this does not necessarily mean they will. It is not until age 11–12 that they are able to think abstractly. Even after adolescents possess the capabilities to understand persuasive advertising, they can still be affected by advertisements that address the way they view themselves and want others to view them through appearance and a need to belong. Owing to their limited skills and maturity compared to adults, children are unable to take full responsibility for their actions and self-regulate effectively. This makes them particularly susceptible to marketing, especially advertisements promoting unhealthy foods, which poses a significant risk as it intentionally targets the most vulnerable demographic with unhealthy or junk food.

== Television advertising ==
Television is the most active way for advertisers to bring messages about their food products to young children. More than 75% of US food manufacturer's budgets go to television advertisements. Because children begin watching television very early in life, about two hours of television daily for children between 2 and 4 years old, it is a crucial time for marketers to begin to build their brand relationship. Food advertisements account for more than 50% of all the advertisements that are targeted towards children who can see up to three hours of food advertisements a week. The advertisements that are most frequently played are those that promote food high in fat and sugar, such as breakfast cereal and candy. For example, McDonald's stands out as a frontrunner among fast food chains in targeting young children through television advertising. In 2016, McDonald's spent $32.9 million to television advertisements tailored explicitly for Happy Meals, designed with children in mind. Moreover, McDonald's outpaces its competitors by employing strategies that resonate with children, such as providing complimentary cartoon characters and animal figurines in their Happy Meals. The fast food industry also makes up a considerable amount of the total food advertisements, 11%. These are strategically played during times that advertisers know their audience will be predominately children, such as during Saturday morning children's programming.

== In-school marketing ==
In recent years, US public schools have begun to increase the amount of in-school marketing that they allow. Marketers and advertisers have been able to increase their presence in schools largely due to the fact that US public schools are financially vulnerable and in desperate need of funding. For advertisers and marketers, in-school marketing reaches a large target audience and therefore is an effective way to increase sales and improve product loyalty. There are thousands of schools in the US that have entered into contracts with companies that allow them to exclusively sell their products, mostly soft drinks, in their school and at school events. A total of 92% of these schools receive a percentage of the total sales revenue. Along with this, a smaller percentage, around 40%, will receive further incentives such as donated equipment if total revenues reach a specified amount as stated in their contract.

=== Direct advertising ===
Advertisers have found ways to directly advertise to students including through logos and company names on school buses, athletic scoreboards and athletic jerseys. They place advertisements on both the interior and exterior of schools. Companies are able to deliver their advertisements through the Channel One program. This is a program that is played in 38% of US public schools. It is a 12-minute program of current events and includes two minutes of advertisements, most of which are food advertisements. In return for showing this mandatory program in their classrooms, schools are offered free equipment. In-school advertisements are placed on textbook covers, lesson plans and educational comics. Companies such as Cover Concepts provide free sponsored materials to schools that are covered with advertisements, including food advertisements. According to Cover Concept promotional materials: "Cover Concepts places your brand directly into the hands of kids and teens in a clutter-free environment. We work in tandem with school administrators to distribute free, advertiser-sponsored materials to over 30 million students – grades K-12 – in 43,000 authorized schools nationwide, plus additional reach in daycare centers throughout the country." Clients of Cover Concepts include McDonald's, Pepsi, Frito Lay and M&M's. Companies see this as an effective way to reach their target audience in an uncluttered environment.

=== Indirect advertising ===
Ways that corporations are able to indirectly advertise to consumers in schools are commonly through incentive programs. Many schools in the US use programs that are almost always sponsored by local restaurant corporations, most commonly McDonald's and Pizza Hut, as educational tools to promote reading. As prizes for the completion of the program are given gift certificates to that corporation's fast food restaurant. Pizza Hut offers a program, Book-it, which offers certificates for free pizzas when participating students read a certain number of books. Other companies that are involved in this type of advertising are Campbell's (Prego Thickness Experiment), Domino's (Encounter Math), and the National Potato Board (Count Your Chips).

== Internet ==
The internet is a more direct and personal way for marketers to reach their young audience. US census data taken in 2001 revealed that 51% of US children 10–13 years old and 61% of 14- to 17-year-olds have access to the internet from their homes. For food marketers and advertisers to effectively reach the increasing number of children on the web, they have had to come up with new and creative ways to engage them. Designing a website that attracts children is known as creating a "branded environment". These sites have been specifically tailored to attract young children through the combination of products placed into games, puzzles, contests, quizzes, riddles, music, e-mail cards, clips of their commercials, and sweepstakes; all of which revolve around the food product. Almost all of these food sites feature their cartoon spokes-characters or popular cartoon characters.

== Promotions ==
Films often promote and market their movies in conjunction with food and beverage corporations. This is known as cross-selling and tie-ins which include a combination of promotional efforts to promote and sell a product. Food corporations have formed tight bonds with television studios. Burger King and Nickelodeon work closely along with McDonald's and Fox Kids Network. Disney has signed global marketing agreements with McDonald's, most recently a ten-year agreement in 1996. The release of Star Wars: Episode III – Revenge of the Sith in 2005 had sixteen different food promotions with twenty-five different products. In 2005 the release of King Kong promoted the giant gorilla on over 18 million boxes of cereal, including Apple Jacks and Corn Pops. They also teamed up with Burger King, Butterfinger and Baby Ruth Bars to put out another 10 million packages with their promotion. Even though the marketing for both of these films was heavily targeting a younger demographic, both films were rated PG-13.

Premiums are a marketing strategy that reward a purchase with something free along with it. Kids' meals at fast food restaurants commonly use premiums like toys to promote something. Premiums allow sales to increase for a short period of time because a child's desire for the food is overthrown by the desire for the item.

== Product placement ==
Corporations will pay a fee that varies, usually somewhere between $50,000 and $100,000, for their product to be placed in primetime programs. Product placement is done to raise brand awareness and increase sales. Most product placement is done subtly and used as a prop in a television program or movie or it can be made into a more fundamental part of the plot. In 2004, Coca-Cola paid an estimated $20 million to have their product placed in American Idol, which had consistently been rated one of the top 10 shows for children between the ages of two and eleven years old. Product placement began to make its way into feature films in the 1980s when reports surfaced that sales of the candy Reese's peanut butter cups had increased 65% as a result of its placement in the movie E.T., The Extra Terrestrial. Mountain Dew produced a film, First Descent (2005), that featured snowboards and helmets all embellished with their brand logo. Even though product placement in children's programs is prohibited after 1974 by the FTC, it is evident that it is still in practice. There are no regulations on product placement in films, videogames or the Internet. "Advergaming" is a relatively new term in which computer games are built completely around a product with the ultimate goal of maintaining the child's attention to that specific product for longer than it would be held with a traditional commercial. These websites feature games that revolve around their specific products and favor players who purchase it. A part of many film marketing campaigns involves teaming up with a food corporation to promote both the film and the product. In 2007, the Kraft Lunchable's site allowed visitors to access a limited number of games for their promotion of the movie Transformers unless they had a promotional code that could be found inside the product.

== US regulations ==
The US has only a few policies in place for regulating the advertisements that are directed at children. Children's Advertising Review Unit (CARU) of the National Council of Better Business Bureaus has established a code within the advertising industry of self-regulation. The guidelines set by CARU apply to all types of children's advertising but hold no actual legal authority and is dependent on voluntary compliance. These seven basic guidelines touch upon areas such as product presentation and claims, endorsement and promotion by program characters, sales pressures, disclosures and disclaimers and safety concerns. CARU is an organization made up primarily of members from the food industry. The Federal Communications Commission and the Federal Trade Commission regulate advertising at the federal level. The two hold different responsibilities within the realm of advertising. The FCC is responsible for establishing what the public interest is and ensures that it is being served by television broadcasters. The FTC is responsible for the regulation of advertising that they deem as being unfair or deceptive to the viewer. In the United States, compliance with school food policies or guidelines is generally low.

=== Television ===
The regulations of television advertisements to children first began in the 1970s by a children's advocacy group, Action of Children's Television. ACT advised both the FCC and FTC that it would be in the best interest of children if advertisements directed towards them were either prohibited or greatly limited. Four years later the FCC passed a law stating that only a specific amount of advertising time, 12 minutes/hour on weekdays and 9.5 minutes/hour on weekends, would be allowed to air during children's programming. As a result of the Children's Television Act passed in 1990, children's advertising is limited to 10.5 minutes/hour on weekends and 12 minutes/hour on weekdays.

=== Internet ===
Advertising on the internet is essentially unrestricted. CARU attempted to revise its guidelines in 1997 to include the internet but with its rapid development of new techniques they have proven to be substantially weaker than those that have been applied to television. Before Congress passed the Children's Online Privacy Act in 1998, companies were able to collect personal data from children to learn their preferences and interests. This law went into effect in 2000 and restricts certain data from being collected and requires parental permission for the collection of personal information for children under the age of 13. Through surveys with incentives and prizes for completion, companies were able to conduct market research which was then used to create more personalized marketing campaigns to children.

=== Policy outside of the US ===
Countries around the world outside of the United States have taken measures to improve the marketing industry how it targets children for food advertisements. Countries such as Norway, Sweden, and Quebec have gone so far as to ban food advertisements completely from children's television. Other countries situated in Europe, Australia, Malaysia, Korea and Russia have less harsh national laws that limit advertisements from playing at specific times. These countries also have limited the use of cartoons and characters as a market technique to draw children in. US schools can often be seen carrying vending machines marketing certain food items, having fundraisers advertising certain products or companies, or even having sponsored school supplies that advertise for companies. For instance, Gatorade, a sports drink made by the Quaker Oats Company, sponsors many school sports teams with their water bottles and other gear. This type of advertising in schools has been prohibited in countries such as Belgium, Quebec, Portugal, Vietnam, and areas of Germany.

== See also ==
- Kid Food
- Pester power
