= Advertising to children =

Promotion of products and services to children

Children in a 2019 television commercial for My Little Pony toys, encouraging viewers to "join the rainbow squad" by collecting differently colored toys

Advertising products or services to children raises questions regarding the application, duration, impact on young people, and ethical considerations surrounding the practice of targeting children with advertising. Understanding the effects of advertising on children's behavior and well-being is a complex and evolving field of study.

Advertising is defined by national laws and advertising standards. In advertising law, the definition of a child varies from one jurisdiction to another, but the age of 12 is commonly used as a cut-off point. Various countries and jurisdictions have restrictions or bans on advertising to children. The European Union also has framework legislation in place which sets down minimum provisions on advertising to children.

== Scope and form ==
The United Nations Educational, Scientific and Cultural Organization (UNESCO) defines early childhood as ages 0–8 years. For the purposes of advertising law, the definition of a child varies from one jurisdiction to another. However, the age of 12 is commonly used as a cut-off point. This cut-off point is made in consideration of the widespread academic view that by age 12 children have developed their behavior as consumers, can effectively recognize advertising, and are able to adopt critical attitudes towards it.

== Types ==
Advertising to children can take place on traditional media such as television, radio, print, new media, internet and other electronic media. The use of packaging, in-store advertising, event sponsorship, and promotions can also be classified as advertising.

=== Television ===
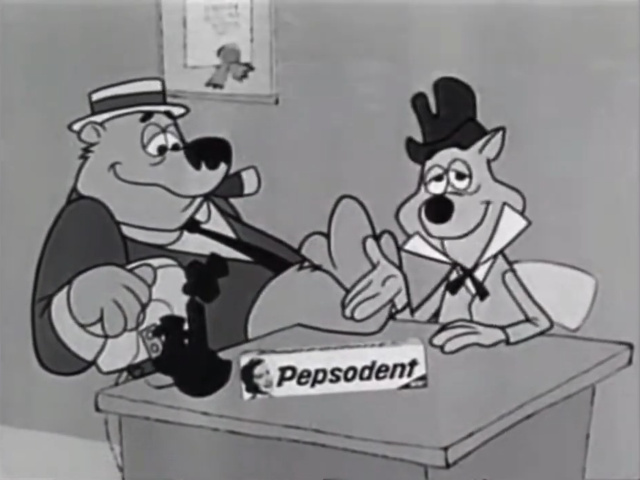
A children's cartoon includes promotion of the sponsor, a toothpaste company.

Many advertisements depict children around the same age as the viewer. The latest technologies, from laptops and mobile phones, to toys are being advertised by companies to attract customers. Companies have new mediums and methods to spread their advertisements as a result of these emerging technologies. Children can watch commercials with children of the same age acting overjoyed about a product, thus encouraging them to also purchase the product. Advertising has a strong hold on behavior, as children are known to act out behavior and repeat quotes heard on advertisements—even in situations contextually separate from the ad. Television advertisements can create peer attention between children which may attract them to buy the products. Companies will still use ads to target children because they are worth billions in sales.

The effect is seen mainly in young children. According to a study from the UK, it states that celebrities who endorse specific foods in television commercials are a powerful influence on children, and that effect may extend beyond the advertisement itself. That study contained 181 children, and was concluded that children ate more potato chips after seeing advertisements featuring a popular UK sports figure than children who only watched commercials for toys and nuts.

Jason C. G. Halford from University of Liverpool stated that when children viewed celebrity "Gary Lineker in the advertisement, they ate a lot more crisps... but what was surprising was when we showed him presenting his show we found that it had the same effect as the advertisement." Many types of research indicate that children are more likely to pick foods sponsored by celebrities, even when it is just fruit. A study in 2012 found that children who were offered both cookies and apples were more likely to choose the apple, if it had an Elmo (a popular children's toy and Sesame Street character) sticker on it. Researchers say that this phenomenon is worrisome, since most foods advertised on television are unhealthy, and linked to a child's health and weight long-term.

Children are attracted to television advertisements, especially those featuring their favorite cartoons, which not only engage them positively but also create an intention to make purchases. McDonald's stands out as a leader in targeting young children through television ads among fast-food chains. In 2016, McDonald's allocated $32.9 million for television advertising, with a specific focus on promoting Happy Meals tailored to children. Moreover, McDonald's outperforms other fast-food brands by employing strategies such as providing free cartoon characters and animal figurines in their Happy Meals.

=== Social media ===
Advertising to children and teenagers is a large business with $3.2 billion dedicated to nondigital forms and $900 million allotted to digital advertising in the United States in 2018. This budget has been predicted to increase in value in the coming years. Digital media and mobile devices have introduced a new wave of advertising, which now includes a wide range of marketing approaches seen on the Internet, social media, video games, mobile games, and more. Sponsored content, as seen on platforms like TikTok and YouTube, as well as gamified advertising which includes commercial content, hidden ads, and incentivised ads, are newer methods for marketing messages to be delivered. These new marketing approaches allow advertisers to gather data on consumer behaviour by tracking activity and influencing users by enhancing the effectiveness of advertisements.

Social media platforms such as YouTube allow for influencers to expand their consumer reach due to the large followings they have. YouTube has increased in popularity due to its alternative form of entertainment for children. According to research conducted at the Pew Research Center in 2018, 81% of parents in the United States allow their kids to watch YouTube. The format used by the platform allows for advertisements to be played before a video begins as well as being interspersed throughout. Content creators on YouTube may also promote brands directly or indirectly in their videos.

Kid influencers are a particular genre of influencer who primarily create videos and social media posts either unboxing and playing with toys or interacting and engaging in activities with friends and family. The content being generated on social media platforms include commercial content and marketing messages expressed in different ways. For example, unboxing videos show influencers actively reviewing a product to which they have a paid sponsorship with. Influencers may instead decide to discretely advertise by simply playing with a product. If promoting a brand, these influencers are often highly paid. Popular kid influencer Ryan from Ryan’s World on YouTube earned $22 million in 2018 through paid endorsements.

Kid influencers are seen as highly relatable individuals who have the ability to appeal to a diverse audience, thus making them good candidates for marketing purposes. Influencer marketing is a new phenomenon that relies on compensating influencers through paid promotion or free products in exchange for the advertisers’ ability to have control over the content being delivered. Children who follow these individuals tend to develop one-sided parasocial relationships (PSR) with the influencer, with which they form an emotional connection, perceiving them as a friend. As children develop a PSR, they tend to neglect the fact that the influencer is a paid promoter of a product and instead view them as a credible and trustworthy source of product recommendations.

== History ==
In the 20th century, the compulsory education of children was established which consequently made school-age children the target audiences of many publications.

The publications in an attempt to raise potential sales, comic book promotion to the youth market rose in the 20th century. During this era, spot advertising (a form of advertising where advertisements appear between programs) came to be known as a prodigious way of advertising. Additionally, sponsorship arrangements became increasingly popular as an advertising medium. In the United States, advertisers sponsored television programs or films to promote their products through broadcast media.

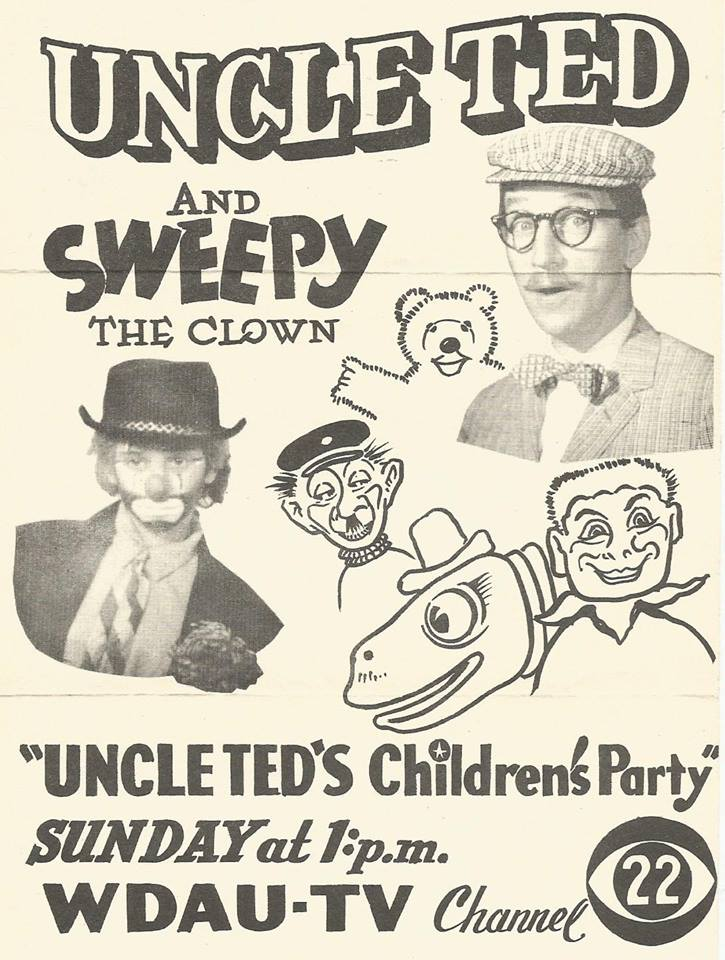
An advertisement for a TV show targeted at children

With this rise in targeted advertising, concerns prevailed regarding advertising's ability to easily manipulate young children due to a limited ability to comprehend the implicit objective of advertisers. Such concerns drove the introduction of national laws and advertising standards. Through the 1970s, the Big Three television networks in the United States did not view children as a desirable target audience, because they had no income of their own.

Before national laws and advertising standards were introduced, a content creator on YouTube could promote their own merchandising during a video with no distinction between the video and the advertisement.

A late-August 2016 report indicated that various Internet streaming services, such as Netflix, have prevented children of the 2010s from seeing 150 hours of commercials every year.

== Effects on children ==
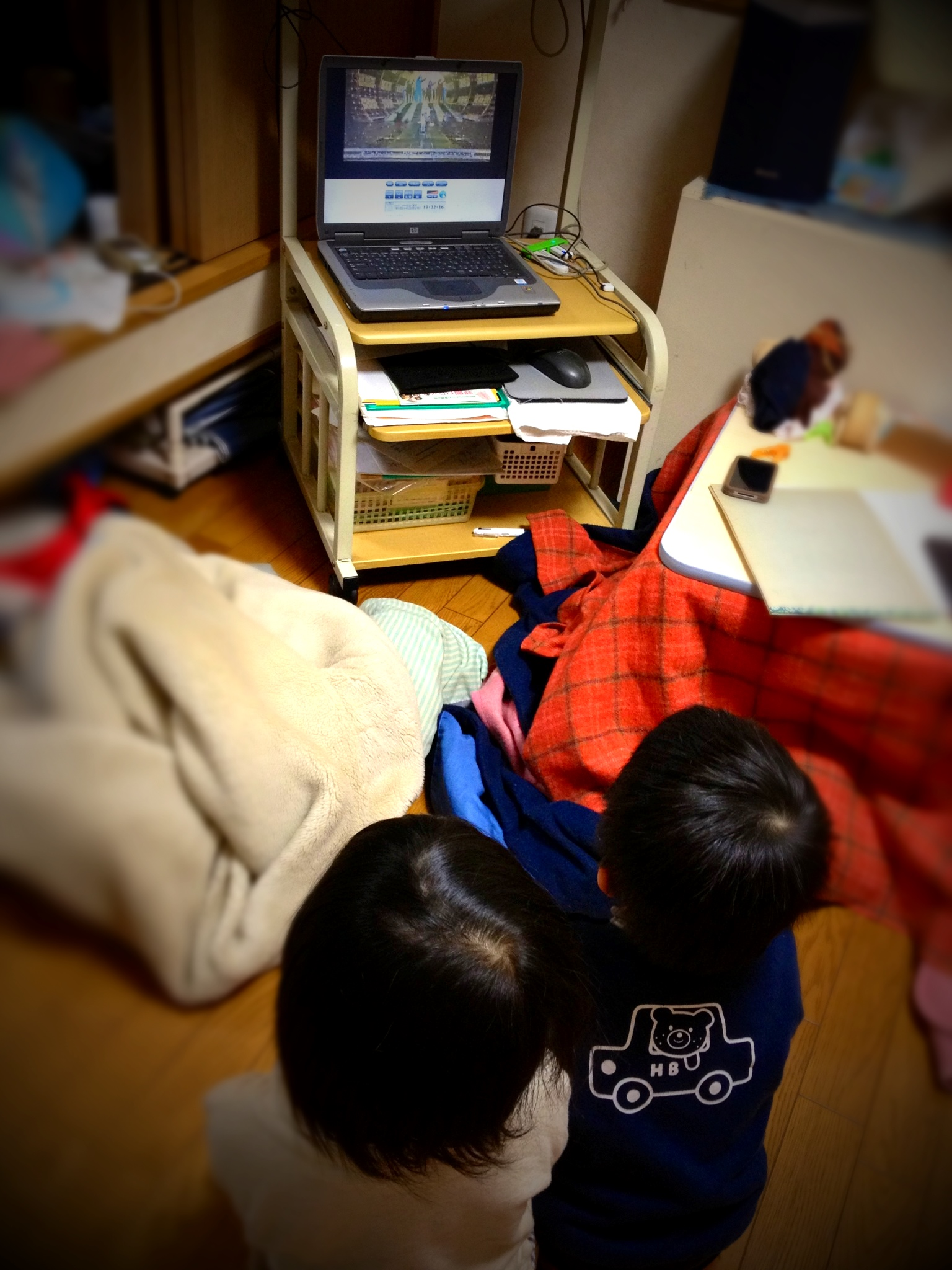
Children watching media on a laptop

Studies estimate that children between the ages of 6 and 11 spend on average 28 hours a week watching television and are exposed to as many as 20,000 commercials in a single year. The maximum number of 30-second ads that can appear in an hour of children's television is 24 ads on weekdays, 21 ads per hour on weekends. If a child watches one hour of programming daily, it translates to nearly 160 advertisements seen per week. Since the 1970s, there has been a large amount of concern as to whether or not children can comprehend advertisements and the extent to which they do so. A study conducted by Goldberg, M. E., & Gorn, G. J. in 1983 looked at the acquisition of children's cognitive defenses and found that until the age of 8 most children are unable to understand the selling intent of televised advertisements. Between the ages of 8 and 10 children only have a partial understanding of selling intent, and it is not until at least the age of 11 that a child is able to fully understand the selling intent of televised advertisements. The study concludes that there is a large difference in a basic understanding of the purpose of advertising between children of a younger age and of older age, and as a result, different age groups have different reactions to television-based advertisements.

Examples of cognitive abilities that impact a child's ability to understand the intention of advertisements and commercials are theory of mind and executive functioning. Comprehending the persuasive nature of advertisements and understanding brand symbolism are directly correlated with these cognitive skills.

There are positive and negative implications to television advertising on young children, for both marketers and the children who view the advertisements. A study conducted in 2014 found a link between advertisements and the development of materialism in children. Children who were exposed to commercials displayed a stronger inclination to acquire products compared to children who did not, which in turn reinforced the development of materialism. A positive effect that advertising can have on children is increased autonomy and personal growth, both of which are categorized as dimensions of psychological wellbeing. Many advertising aimed at children is criticized for enforcing gender stereotypes. Some countries have broadcast codes that suggest that television advertisements should not contain exaggerated claims that will mislead or deceive children, abuse their trust or lack the understanding of persuasive intent in an advertisement.

Many parents report being pestered by their children for the product they have seen on television. This phenomenon is dubbed "pester power", which means that little children pester their parents to buy things for them that they desire. A study showed that mothers are more likely to purchase a product for their children due to the emotional appeal of their children's response to an advertisement.

Critics have likewise communicated concern with respect to the predominance of promoting brutal media, for example, films and computer games, focusing on children. Three reports by the Federal Trade Commission discovered significant help for such charges, and keeping in mind that reviews have not legitimately surveyed the effect of such publicizing, revealing that such advertisements do influence children's media inclinations.

=== Advertising effects on children ===
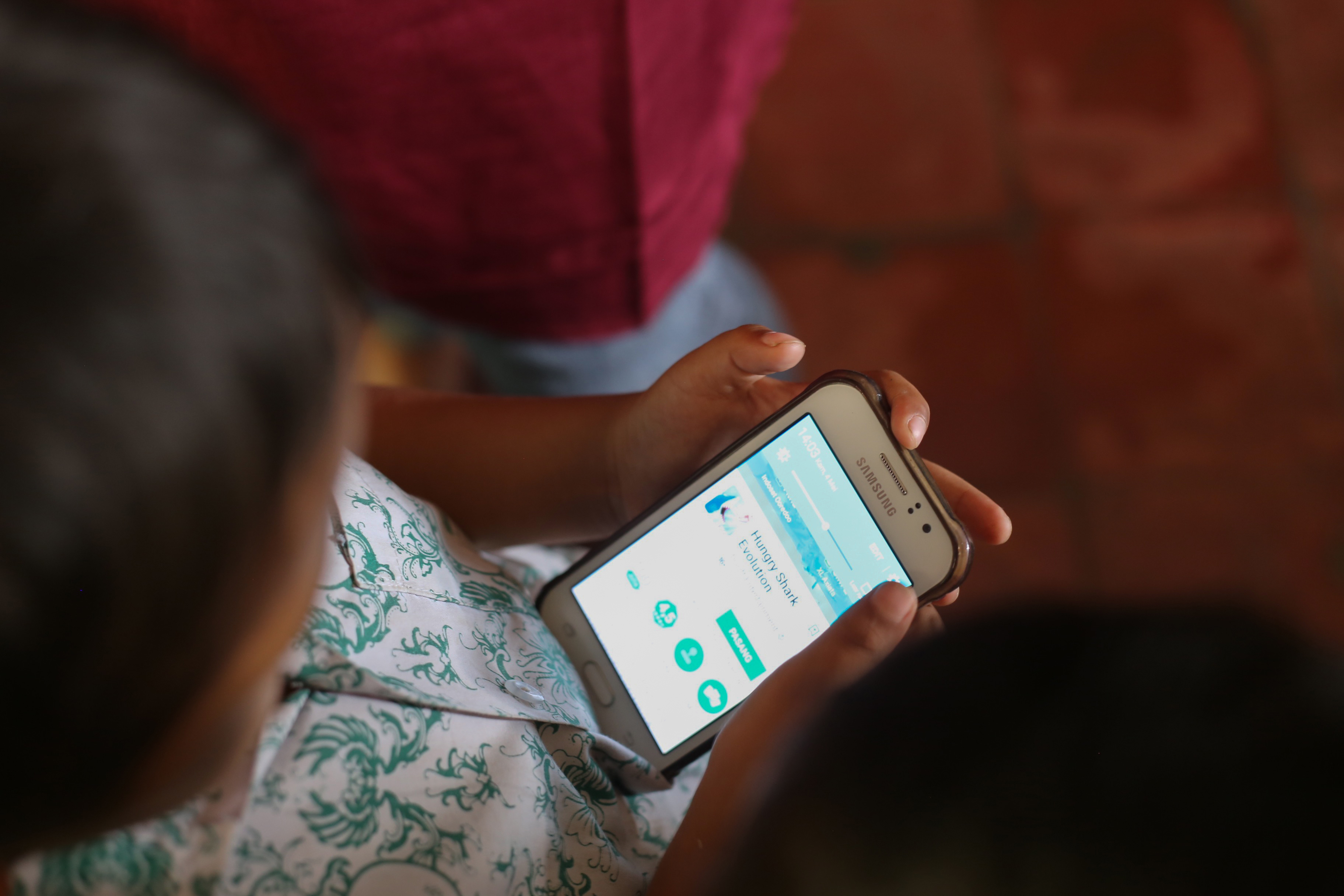
A child downloading a mobile game

One cause for concern for children is deceptive phone applications directed at them by appearing to be free, but have hidden fees within the app. In these instances, the initial download of the game application has no cost. However, when children are playing the game, there will be fees to gain new features for advancing to new levels. If the child would want to continue playing the game, they could have in-app purchases using their parent's credit card. Many apps ask for billing information, but there is a certain amount of time that the app is actually free. After the trial expires, the application automatically charges the person if they did not cancel before it ended. Kids who might not be aware of how things are marketed could accumulate charges on their parent's phone bills without their knowledge or consent.

== Food ==
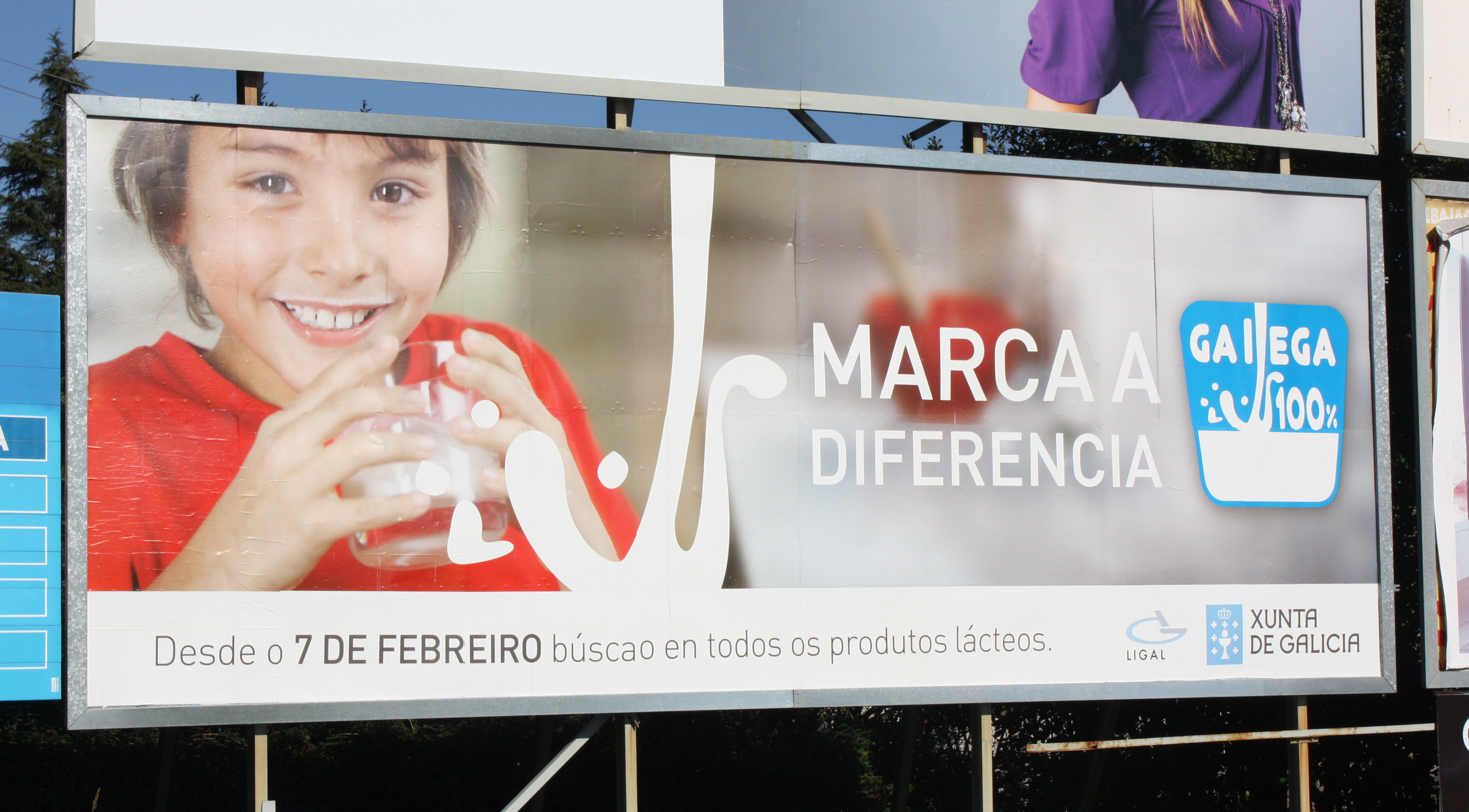
A billboard advertising dairy products depicts a child with a glass of milk.

Food is the second most frequently advertised type of product on television, and this can greatly affect the mindset and the thinking of young children, especially with regard to unhealthy food products. Advertising of unhealthy foods to children increases their consumption of the product and positive attitudes (liking or wanting to buy) about the advertised product. Children's critical reasoning (the ability to understand what an advertisement is and the aim of advertising to buy the product) is not protective against the impact of advertising, and does not appear to be fully developed during adolescence.

Many studies have been conducted indicating an early exposure to food advertising to 2–13-year-old children has a link to the increasing number of childhood obesity cases globally. The large exposure to commercial food has been linked to problems for children worldwide, among these problems the issue of child obesity.

In 2015 the Centers for Disease Control and Prevention found that the number of obese children is more than double the number it was 30 years ago. There is a suggested correlation between televised advertisements and obesity. A study conducted by Frederick J. Zimmerman and Janice F. Bell made the statement that "Commercial television pushes little children to eat a large quantity of those foods they should consume least: sugary cereals, snacks, fast food and soda pop". On average children between the ages of 8 and 12 see 21 fast food advertisements a day through televised media. Children decide their food preference at an early moment through a preliminary learning process and when they are exposed to large amounts of fast food advertising it has major long-lasting implications on their diet. Children's gullibility and lack of knowledge around commercial food allow them to easily trust what an advertisement says. As a result, companies can falsely display food items to children and what these children think to be healthy and nutritious is unhealthy, being high in fats and sugars.

The use of promotional characters and premium offers are often used as persuasive tools to market food to children. A study from Australia found that the rate of promotional characters in advertisements, such as The Milky Bar Kid for Nestle Milky Bar chocolate (in Australia) or Bart Simpson for Butterfinger (in America), is twice as high during popular younger children's programs in comparison to popular older children's programs. Premium offers are another persuasive marketing which includes competitions, giveaways and vouchers. The same study found that unhealthy food advertisements contain 18 times as many premium offers during young children's programs in comparison to adult programs.

Additionally, several studies have identified that the amount of fruit and vegetables consumed decreases as television viewing time increases. Excessive television viewing often correlates to poor diet quality as a result. In the UK, only 1.2% of broadcast advertising spend is towards fresh vegetables, therefore indicating a lack of health-focused endorsement to children and families.

The World Health Organization suggested that companies and organizations make a reduction of "food and beverage marketing directed at little children that are high in sugar, fat, and sodium in order to help reduce the burden of obesity worldwide."

In Canada, the majority of advertising is controlled by companies themselves. In April 2007, 16 of the largest food and beverage companies formed an initiative known as The Canadian Children's Food and Beverage Advertising Initiative. The companies decided that each would require that at least 50% of advertisements targeted at children under the age of 12 years old would contain "healthier dietary choices". A study found that exposing children to healthy food advertisements has a positive impact on their attitude towards healthy food, but when unhealthy food advertisements are shown alongside healthy food advertisements, this positive impact is lessened.

Television advertisements not only affect children in the UK, but also affect children from Asiatic countries. A study suggested that children in developing countries may be more vulnerable to food promotions as they are less familiar with, and potentially less critical of, advertising than children in developed countries, and they may be specifically targeted as an entry point into developing markets as children have been seen to be more flexible than their parents. The needs to provide suitable advertising to children is crucial especially in the age range between 2–13 years old, as they are usually immature and not yet developed their critical thinking which may easily affect their future growth.

=== Regulation ===
In Australia, there is a self-regulatory code toward children's exposure to food advertising. This study was that the proportion of non-core foods advertised decreased by eighteen percent from a previous study from before the self-regulatory code was introduced. This code was created because of the negative impact that the advertising of unhealthy food has on children. The self-regulatory code regulates the use of promotion, popular characters, and unsuitable material during time periods dedicated to children's television programs. The code does not monitor the types of food that may be advertised to children and does not apply to times when a high number of children are viewing such as a sports match. Since the code was introduced the rate of non-core fast food advertising has decreased as seen in the other study mentioned. The self-regulatory code only covers a small time period and range of food. An improved marketing approach would be limiting advertising on a wider range of fast food, not just those designated as children's meals. This study also saw that advertisement that promotes healthier alternatives often still have some non-core foods present.

The Children's Food and Beverage Advertising Initiative (CFBAI) is a voluntary program implemented in 2007 in the United States, in response to public health concerns and food companies have promised to advertise healthier dietary choices in child-directed advertising. The advertising of candy to children appeared that it would decrease as 4 large candy manufacturers, Mars, Hershey, Kraft, and Nestle pledged to CFBAI that they would not advertise any candy product to children. Rather than a reduction in candy advertising, there was a 65% increase in candy-related advertisements in 2011 compared to 2007 before the CFBAI was introduced. A fault with the CFBAI is that it regulates advertising directed at children, many children are exposed to advertisements for candy during programs popular for a wider range of people. Increased participation in CFBAI and a clearer definition of what child-directed advertising is, will be required for a reduction in exposure to children's unhealthy foods.

In the European Union, there was a concern for the quantity and type of television food advertising that children are exposed to. In 2010, the Audiovisual Media Services Directive was created as a centerpiece of the regulation of advertising unhealthy food and drinks in or accompanying children's programs. The directive does not imply consistent regulations across Member states. It does state the "Member States and the Commission shall encourage media service providers to develop codes of conduct regarding inappropriate audiovisual commercial communications, accompanying or included in children's programs, of foods and beverages containing nutrients and substances with a nutritional or physiological effect". Although there isn't a definition of a child and unhealthy food which is shared within the European countries, there is a consistent want for regulation. Each country implements a variation in the strength of its regulations, based on the framework created from the directive. Each country has a different legal point of view toward marketing practices, television regulations and the protection of minors. The individual European Union's Member States' interpretation of the Directive is left to the national regulators to set a clear degree of regulatory protection. This is set by the regulator along with the industry and broadcasters themselves who interpret the provisions. This results in a national regulation of advertising to children that considers the nation's legal and cultural traditions as well as economic and political objectives, which do not always compare across member states. Some member states impose a partial ban on advertising in children's programs, whereas others prohibit the showing of sponsorship logos in children's programs.

== Toys ==
Toy advertising on children plays a significant role in influencing children’s perceptions, preferences, and development. According to research done by Mintel, the top purchase influencers for toys are television commercials (31%), family/friends (31%), children (29%), and window shopping (28%). Advertisers create strong emotional connections between children and toys by associating the toys with beloved characters from movies, cartoons, or games. This technique is effective because children tend to view advertisements as objective and may not understand their persuasive intent. Online platforms, including gaming websites, social media, and video-sharing platforms, have become important channels for toy advertising.

=== Effects on gender stereotypes ===
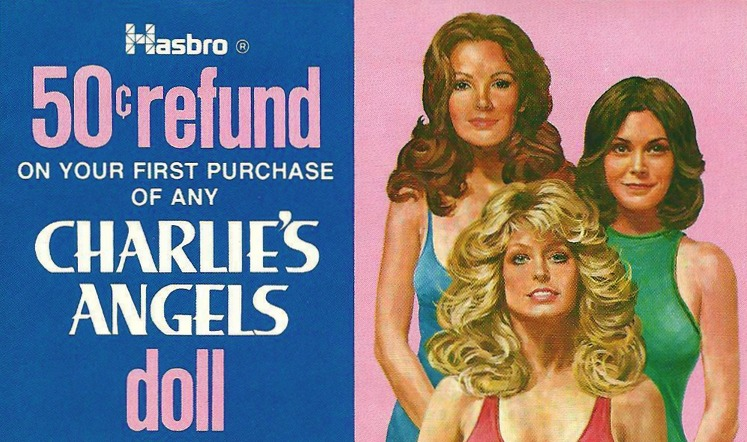
An advertisement for dolls based on the Charlie's Angels television show

Toy advertising has an impact on children’s understanding of gender roles, often perpetuating stereotypes at an early age. Advertisements for boys’ toys often emphasize themes of competition, aggression, and excitement, often using bold colors such as yellow, green, red, and blue. In contrast, commercials for girls’ toys typically showcase domesticity, beauty, and nurturing skills, often using soften colors like pink, purple, and pastel colors. Most often girl toys are dolls and beauty-related products, while boy toys typically include action figures, vehicles and toy guns.

Studies reveal that by age five, children internalize these stereotypes, and respond more favorably to advertisements featuring characters of their own genders. The effects of gendered advertising goes beyond childhood, affecting skill development and influencing career aspirations. Play experiences shaped by these stereotypes reinforces narrow definitions of gender roles, which could limit and influence children’s interest and opportunities later in life. For example, toys marketed to girls focus on social and caregiving skills, which aligns with traditionally female professions.

=== Legislation ===
In the United Kingdom, Greece, Denmark, and Belgium advertising to children is restricted. In Norway, Sweden and the Canadian province of Quebec, advertising to children under the age of 12 is illegal.

The European Union also has framework legislation in place which sets down minimum provisions on advertising to children for all its member states. The EU Audiovisual Media Services Directive sets out several EU-wide rules on advertising and children:

Advertising shall not cause moral or physical detriment to minors, and shall, therefore, comply with the following criteria for their protection:

a. It shall not directly exhort minors to buy a product or a service by exploiting their inexperience or credulity;
b. It shall not directly encourage minors to persuade their parents or others to purchase the goods or services being advertised;
c. It shall not exploit the special trust minors place in parents, teachers or other persons;
d. It shall not unreasonably show minors in dangerous situations

In addition:

e. Children's programs may only be interrupted if the scheduled duration is longer than 30 minutes
f. Product placement is not allowed in children's programs.
g. The Member States and the Commission should encourage audiovisual media service providers to develop codes of conduct regarding the advertising of certain foods in children's programs.

Note that criterion (b) explicitly outlaws appeals to "pester power".

In Australia, there are multiple governing bodies that deal with the legislation of advertising to children. Some of the governing bodies are the Advertising Standards Board, which is appointed by the Advertising Standards Bureau, and Communications Council. Citation "This Code has been adopted by the AANA as part of advertising and marketing self-regulation. The object of this Code is to ensure that advertisers and marketers develop and maintain a high sense of social responsibility in advertising and marketing to children in Australia." (AANA, 2009) The Children's Television Standards (CTS) were implemented in 1990 by the Australian Broadcasting Tribunal (ABT). This was in an attempt to balance:

- Public interest concerns that children's special viewing needs are met and they are protected from possible harmful effects of television.
- The commercial television industry's reliance upon advertising revenue and the need to fund quality programs for children.
- The child audience's lack of earning or 'Buying' capacity, reflected in the limited range of product categories in advertising to children, and also in children's reliance on others (Parents most often) to obtain products they might see advertised on television.

In the United States, advertisements marketed to children (effectively linked to the same regulations which prohibited program-length advertising) were limited between 1946 and 1983. With the Children's Television Act, which was introduced in 1990 and strengthened in August 1996, legislation once again became stricter.

In Brazil, through interpretation of the Federal Constitution, and bounded by the Statute of the Child and Adolescent (ECA) and the Consumer Protection Code (CDC), any advertising directed towards children is prohibited. This falls under Article 227 of the Constitution of the Federative Republic of Brazil, which states "It is the duty of the family, the society and the State to ensure children and adolescents, with absolute priority, the right to life, health, nourishment, education, leisure, professional training, culture, dignity, respect, freedom and family and community life, as well as to guard them from all forms of negligence, discrimination, exploitation, violence, cruelty and oppression."

In Canada, the main regulatory code for advertising to children is The Canadian Association of Broadcasters’ (CAB) Broadcasting Code for Advertising to Children. This code pertains to paid promotions and messages aired on television during or immediately before/after children’s programming. Abiding by this code is mandatory for all broadcasting channels who wish to advertise to children; this is enforced through a committee responsible for the pre-clearance of advertisements, namely Advertising Standards Canada’s (ASC) Children’s Clearance Committee.

The provisions in this code pertain mainly to factual presentation of products, the appropriateness of advertised products, how much pressure an advertisement is placing on children, scheduling regulations for advertising to children, as well as the use of well known characters or personalities in the promotion of a product to children. In 2005, the Children’s Broadcast Advertising Clearance Guide was published to help with the compliance of advertisers, advertising agencies, and broadcasters with the provisions included in CAB’s Broadcasting Code for Advertising to Children.

The Canadian Code of Advertising Standards also contains regulations pertaining to advertisement to children. This provisions focus on the ethical advertising to children on the part of non-broadcasters. It outlines that one should not be taking advantage of the naïveté and impressionability of children when advertising directly to them.

Quebec provincial law stands out from the nationwide regulations that exist. In Quebec, advertisements directed at people under the age of 13 are generally prohibited. This is a prohibition that is unique to the province of Quebec. This rule is outlined in section 248 of the Quebec Consumer Protection Act followed by the outlining of the methods of deeming an advertisement to be directed at people under the age of 13 in section 249.

Across these regulations, the definition of a child is not uniform. The age to be considered a child varies from 12 to 13 among these different regulatory codes and provisions.

=== Advertising standards ===
In many countries, advertising is also governed by self-regulatory codes of conduct. Advertisers, advertising agencies and the media agree on a code of advertising standards enforced by a self-regulatory organization. At a minimum, the general aim of self-regulatory codes is to ensure that any advertising is 'legal, decent, honest and truthful, but in most countries, detailed rules are in place for different advertising techniques and sectors.

On a global level, the International Chamber of Commerce has drafted a global code on marketing communications. All forms of marketing communications worldwide must conform to the ICC Consolidated Code on Advertising and Marketing. The code includes a specific section, detailing the special care needed when communicating with children.

Since 2006, a global code of practice on food marketing communications is also in place. The Framework for Responsible Food and Beverage Marketing Communications of the International Chamber of Commerce (ICC) sets down global requirements for food and beverage marketing communications on all media, including the Internet.

Many countries have implemented self-regulatory provisions that use the ICC Framework as a basis, but go further in several respects, depending on local considerations. Examples include Australia, Brazil, Canada, Chile, France, Ireland, The Netherlands, New Zealand, Spain, the UK and the USA.

In the United States, the Children's Advertising Review Unit (CARU) of the Council of Better Business Bureaus (CBBB) established in 1974 by the National Advertising Review Council (NARC) runs a self-regulatory program that includes a prescreening service for advertisers to ensure they are in compliance with COPPA and the CARU guidelines.

In addition to industry-wide self-regulation, individual companies and industry sectors have introduced a wide range of additional provisions relating to marketing communications directed at children. For example, most multinational food and beverage companies have developed their own policies on food and beverage marketing communications to children, and have announced the joint implementation of these individual commitments.

In July 2007, ten companies announced a common pledge in the US—the Children's Food and Beverage Advertising Initiative, mirroring a similar initiative by 15 companies in Canada—the Canadian Children's Food & Beverage Advertising Initiative; and followed by 11 companies in Europe with the EU Pledge. Under these initiatives, participating companies will cease advertising to children under 12, other than products that meet specific nutritional guidelines, based on international scientific recommendations. A similar program was launched by leading food companies in Thailand in May 2008 and in Australia in mid-2009.

== See also ==
- Advertisements in schools
- Child development
- Comic book advertisement
- Toy advertising
- Kid Food
