= Advertisements in schools in the United States =

Societal debate

Advertisements in schools is a controversial issue that is debated in the United States. Naming rights of sports stadiums and fields, sponsorship of sports teams, placement of signage, vending machine product selection and placement, and free products that children can take home or keep at school are all prominent forms of advertisements in schools.

Debates on advertisements in schools can vary depending on factors such as location, age group, school type, and the context of the advertisement (e.g., during after-school events or within the school premises). Some argue that limited or monitored advertisements and sponsorships, such as those on school buses or in school sports, can provide much-needed funding for school events, fundraisers, activities, or school supplies that the school might otherwise lack. Advocates of this perspective contend that such advertising can be a practical solution to support educational initiatives. On the other hand, there are those who believe that schools should remain advertisement-free, emphasizing concerns about potential commercial influence on students or the distraction it may pose to the learning environment. The viewpoints on this subject can vary depending on factors such as the placement of advertisements and the extent of limitations imposed on them.

== Types of advertisements in schools ==
=== Buses ===
Many state laws permit advertising to be sold on the exterior and fewer permit advertising on the interior of school buses. However, many of these laws prohibit ads for political speech, tobacco, alcohol, gambling, drugs, or material of sexual nature.

=== Free Products ===
Restaurant and fast-food chains frequently offer free treats in the form of coupons to students who receive good grades or have good attendance on their report card. In certain districts, free cell phones are offered to students who receive text messages from companies promoting academic success. Additionally, educational materials are donated to classrooms as a way to support a curriculum. Oftentimes these materials contain the company's logo or views that are subjective to the company.

=== Media ===
Channel One News was a program designed for and broadcast to elementary, middle and high school students. It contained commercial advertising. Its advertising regulations changed over the years; they restricted advertisements related to food and beverages that were inconsistent with their healthy lifestyle initiatives, gambling, motion pictures above PG-13, politics, religion, and tobacco or alcohol products.

=== Sponsorship ===
Sponsorship of school sports teams and fields or stadiums is common. Many high school teams have received uniforms, shoes, and funding for upkeep of their stadiums or fields in exchange for naming rights or the team wearing the sponsor's logo. Companies will also offer discounts to the team members they are sponsoring as a way to push sales.

Sponsorship also comes in the form of funds given to have the company's logo put on report cards and supply lists. Companies know back-to-school time is a great time to increase profit. By putting their marketing material on school supply lists it encourages parents to shop at their stores instead of others.

=== Vending machine products ===
Food and beverage companies spend on average $150 million each year advertising in schools. Many of the drinks and foods are advertised and made available through vending machines. Even with regulations on what types of foods are allowed to be sold and marketed, the food and drink companies are still able to advertise their brand to students.

== Arguments in favor of advertising ==
According to some school administrators, states have cut funding for K-12 education consistently for the last eight years causing many districts to cut jobs, increase class size, and cut spending on supplies. Using advertisements in schools is a way to raise money for school districts. As a matter of fact, schools, especially in less affluent areas, need ways to raise money in order to keep school programs alive and alleviate the financial burden presented by the funding cuts.

One argument in favor of relaxing the norms that limit corporate advertising in schools is justified by the seemingly-ceaseless saturation of all media markets (internationally) with commercial advertising. Children must be sufficiently prepared for the world beyond graduation, and essential components of this preparation (for our media-saturated present and future) include media literacy and economics. Some states have implemented these courses into their graduation requirements to meet the demand, but most boards of education stop short of directly immersing an entire school community into these topics by deregulating their advertising policies.

Proponents also argue that children must be educated and seasoned as interpreters of marketing strategies from a young age so that they become discerning and conscious consumers as adults. Today, due to cultural shifts, young children have less apparent authority to make purchases directly than they have in past decades, but there has been suggestion that parental supervision already serves as the only necessary check on the growing influence of any deliberate advertising in elementary schools. Furthermore, it has been suggested that stripping K–12 education of all visible corporate advertising reinforces a common misconception that the education system is uniquely immune from any heavy-handed influence of the private sector. This, in turn, lays the groundwork for a distorted understanding of the necessary, reciprocal-yet-falliable relationship that exists between state agencies and private companies.

Others have argued that some advertisements, particularly those which emphasize positive character development in children (healthy diet, mental health, etc.), have potential to reinforce any positive choices made by school-aged children in those same areas.

== Arguments against advertising ==
According to critics, many advertisements endorse products that are detrimental to children's health, such as unhealthy food, and some people argue that children are more easily drawn to persuasive advertisements than adults. It has also been argued that schools should be environments where students will not be distracted from their work by advertisements.

Channel One News has 2 minutes of advertising for every 12 minutes of news. Students can lose up to a full day of class time over a year for advertisements.

There is a concern that children do not understand the motivation behind ads. Children under the age of 13 are a vulnerable population that lacks the executive functioning skills to comprehend what the advertisement is trying to sell and the techniques used to persuade and frame customer decisions. Children do not possess the same knowledge of advertising tactics as adults and are more susceptible to their persuasive intent. Elementary school children are not necessarily able to comprehend the fact that advertising agencies may have a different perspective from their own.

== Restrictions on advertisements ==
Each state in the United States of America can define additional regulations for advertising in its local schools.

The National School Lunch and School Breakfast Programs: Nutrition Standards for All Foods Sold in School, as Required by the Healthy, Hunger-Free Kids Act of 2010 was updated in 2013 to reform school lunch options. This placed restrictions on what could be served in vending machines and sold on school grounds, with the exception of fundraisers (often candy bars or doughnuts) and after-school events.

This caused a shift in advertising for many companies as it phased out advertising of sugary drinks and "snack" foods. While the Coca-Cola Company would not be able to advertise Coca-Cola, it can advertise other product lines such as Diet Coke and Dasani.

In 2006 the Children's Food and Beverage Advertising Initiative was implemented by the Council of Better Business Bureaus as a way to encourage corporations to regulate what they advertise to children. It is not required for businesses to participate in this regulation and there are no legal ramifications if corporations do not participate.

== Corporations that advertise in schools ==
- Adidas
- Apple
- Air Force Academy
- Air Force Reserve
- Almond Board of California
- Army Reserve
- Bank of America
- Chef Boyardee
- Chicklets
- Citibank
- Clearasil
- Cliff Notes
- Coca-Cola Company
- Colgate
- CollegeInvest
- Crest
- CVS
- ESPN
- First National Bank
- Fleet/Norstar Financial Group
- General Foods
- General Foods Birds Eye
- Gerber
- Giftmaster Inc.
- Goodyear
- Hershey's
- Huffy
- Hyatt Regency
- Ikea USA Inc
- Image Photography
- InPro Corp
- KBUN Radio
- Kodak
- McDonald's
- M&M's
- Nestlé Waters
- Nike, Inc.
- NutraSweet
- Pepsi
- Polaroid
- Pony Sneakers
- Procter & Gamble
- Promise Spread
- Reebok Pump
- Reynolds Wrap
- RPM International
- Russell Athletic
- Security State Bank
- SI for Kids Gear
- ShopRite Supermarkets
- Smith Corona
- Snapple
- Speedo
- Stay Free
- Staples Inc.
- Strength System Footwear
- Subway
- Sugar Daddy
- Super 8 Motel
- Sure & Natural
- Tampax
- Target Corporation
- The Market Place
- Time Warner
- Toys ‘R’ Us
- U.S. Navy
- Wegmans
- Welch's Fruit Snacks
- Verizon Wireless
- Women's Sports Foundation

== See also ==
- Marketing in schools
- Consumerism
