= Food market =

Food market may mean

- Marketplace, a public market with vendor stalls or spaces
- A retail store selling food such as a
  - Grocery store
  - Supermarket
  - Hypermarket
  - General store (historically)
- Food marketing, promotion of food for sale
