= Kid Cuisine =

Brand of frozen meals

- The main logo until c. mid-2022
- Industry: Frozen dinner
- Founded: April 1989; 37 years ago
- Area served: United States
- Parent: ConAgra
- Website: kidcuisine.com

Kid Cuisine is an American brand of packaged frozen meals first sold in April 1989 and marketed by Conagra Foods. Described as a "frozen food version of a Happy Meal", the product is marketed towards children, while assuring parents of nutritional benefits. The mascot of the brand is a penguin named K.C. (short for "Kid Cuisine"), while the former was a different penguin named B.J. alongside a polar bear named "The Chef".

== Nutrition and marketing techniques ==
Kid Cuisine is what its own marketing agency in the 1990s and 2000s described as a "kid-driven request item", that is, children would ask their parents to buy these items. Advertisements for Kid Cuisine were consciously aimed at the child, who was urged to request their mothers or parental guardians to buy these items, especially in the upper range of the 3-10 year-old range the brand aimed at. Kid Cuisine relies on advertising with TV and movie characters, including The Avengers, Frozen, SpongeBob SquarePants, and Hello Kitty.

Kid Cuisine variants have been attested historically to be composed of three or four selections of food. Main courses and side dishes have included hamburgers, french fries, tacos, quesadillas, hot dogs, corn dogs, chicken nuggets and drumsticks, macaroni and cheese, fish sticks, pizza, vegetables (most commonly corn), and spaghetti. Desserts are also included with each meal, such as cakes, smoothies, fruit snacks, cookies, brownies, and pudding with color-changing sprinkles. Some breakfast varieties have also been released, like pancakes, sausages, berry toppings, tater tots, and fruit cups.

In 2022, Kid Cuisine changed its logo and mascot to a simpler logo, and K.C. is now depicted as a more realistic penguin rather than the animated version.

=== Criticism ===
The foods sold under the brand often have what Bettina Elias Siegel, author of Kid Food, called "nutritionally questionable combos", including "cheeseburgers or mac and cheese served with corn and gummy candy, [sic] chicken nuggets served with French fries and pudding", among other things. By 2010, such foods were increasingly questioned as the obesity epidemic took center stage, and Conagra developed a new marketing technique to keep convincing mothers to buy these products for their children. With the slogan "The more you know, the less you 'no'", they attempted to convince mothers that Kid Cuisine did actually provide nutritional foods that mothers would not have to say "no" to. But "good reasons" to say "yes" were, according to Siegel, very weak, and included assurances about some of the meals containing minerals and vitamins, and "minor nutritional tweaks" like using whole grain flour for the breading of chicken nuggets. In addition, the brand changed its mascots, ran an ad campaign aimed directly at children, which included games where children could sign up and win prizes. 20,000 children signed up online in 17 days, and many came back again and again to play branded games. The dual strategy that, according to Siegel, is at work here, targets parents and children: parents' "nutritional vigilance" is eroded, while children are encouraged to demand "unhealthy" products.

== Meals ==
Kid Cuisine meals that are still known to be produced, as of 2026:

- All-Star Nuggets
- Popcorn Chicken
- Mini Corn Dogs
- Level Up Dino Nuggets
- Level Up Cheese Quesadillas
- Level Up Mac & Cheese Bites
- Level Up Shark Shaped Fish Sticks
