= CrowdFundEDU =

Education-focused crowdfunding platform

- Website type: Crowdfunding
- Available in: English
- Website: crowdfundedu.com
- Commercial: Yes
- Launched: 2012

CrowdFundEDU was a US-based private for-profit company founded in 2012 that provides a crowd funding website for education. People hold online fundraisers to get contributions for tuition, student loans, books and supplies, sports equipment, events and extracurricular activities. Student debt is recognized as a growing financial burden to young adults, but crowd funding brings an alternative to this form of lending and is considered by some to be one of the greatest financial creations of the digital age.

Students and educators can fundraise for all levels and types of education, not just college and university, but also vocational school, grades K-12 and for a career training seminar. People can fundraise for individual needs or for school fundraising. It has been described as the “Kickstarter for education”.

Many of the fundraisers on the site seems to be focused on college students hoping to raise funds to pay tuition or student loans, but there are also online K-12 school fundraisers, teachers raising funds for classroom expenses, as well as people crowdfunding for e-learning platforms and elementary-age children.

== Concept ==
CrowdFundEDU provides users with a platform to create a fundraising page, offer rewards for different contribution levels, and share their fundraiser through social media. There are many other crowd funding sites, but CrowdFundEDU is a niche site that focuses on education.

CrowdFundEDU seeks to broaden the scope of educational fundraising from the local community to the global population through the use of people's social networks of family, friends, co-workers and colleagues, who can help further spread the word through their own extended networks. Success in funding is largely contributed to the fact that it is easier for many contributors to donate a smaller quantity of money than for a single person to donate a large sum of money.

== Model ==
CrowdFundEDU has a flexible funding approach, which means that fundraisers receive the contributions whether or not their funding goal is reached by the deadline. CrowdFundEDU charges 5% to the fundraiser if the goal is reached and 9% if the goal is not reached. . The difference in fees is to encourage fundraisers to set a realistic goal.

CrowdFundEDU is a preferred PayPal Partner and uses PayPal for all fundraising payment processing and transaction services.

== Categories ==
Fundraisers are categorized into the following categories: Student Debt, College/University Tuition, Trade School, Books & Supplies, Sports, Visual & Performing Arts, Extracurricular Activity, Event & Field Trip, Study Abroad, Certification, Seminar & Workshops, High School Fundraisers, Middle School Fundraisers and Elementary School Fundraisers.

== See also ==
- Comparison of crowd funding services
