= Self-regulatory organization =

In business and finance, an organization with regulatory authority

A self-regulatory organization (SRO) is an organization that exercises some degree of regulatory authority over an industry or profession. The regulatory authority could exist in place of government regulation, or applied in addition to government regulation. The ability of an SRO to exercise regulatory authority does not necessarily derive from a grant of authority from the government.

== United States ==
In United States securities law, a self-regulatory organization is a defined term. The principal federal regulatory authority—the Securities and Exchange Commission (SEC)—was established by the federal Securities Exchange Act of 1934. The SEC originally delegated authority to the National Association of Securities Dealers (NASD, now Financial Industry Regulatory Authority (FINRA)) and to the national stock exchanges (e.g., the NYSE) to enforce certain industry standards and requirements related to securities trading and brokerage. On July 26, 2007, the SEC approved a merger of the enforcement arms of the NYSE and the NASD, to form a new SRO, the Financial Industry Regulatory Authority (FINRA). In addition, Congress created the Municipal Securities Rulemaking Board (MSRB) as an SRO charged with adopting investor protection rules governing broker-dealers and banks that underwrite, trade and sell tax-exempt bonds, 529 college savings plans and other types of municipal securities.

=== Examples ===
The American Arbitration Association is also an SRO with official, statutory status.

Because of the prominence of the SROs in the securities industry, the term SRO is often used to narrowly describe an organization authorized by statute or government agency to exercise control over a certain aspect of the industry.

The National Association of Realtors (NAR) is an example of an SRO that fills the vacuum left by the absence of government oversight or regulation. The NAR sets the rules for multiple listing services and how brokers use them. Another example is the American Medical Association which sets rules for ethics, conflicts, disciplinary action, and accreditation in medicine.

BBB National Programs is an example of an organization that houses multiple SROs, such as the Children's Advertising Review Unit, (CARU) and the National Advertising Division (NAD), formerly known as the Advertising Self-Regulatory Council, which is the U.S. advertising industry's self-regulatory body. In addition to setting guidelines, these programs provide third-party accountability and dispute resolution services to companies, outside and in-house counsel, consumers, and others in arenas such as privacy, advertising, data collection, child-directed marketing, and more.

== Canada ==
=== Ontario ===
A self-regulatory organization (SRO) is an entity that is organized for the purpose of regulating the operations and the standards of practice and business conduct of its members and their representatives with a view to promoting the protection of investors and the public interest.

==== Examples ====
The Canadian Investment Regulatory Organization is an example of an SRO operating within Ontario.

== Kazakhstan ==
The law "On self-regulation" was adopted by the Parliament of Kazakhstan in 2015.

== Russia ==
In 2007, Russia has adopted a law regulating SROs.

== See also ==
- Industry self-regulation
- Outline of organizational theory
- Institute of Internal Auditors, self-regulation
