= Suicide food =

Visual marketing technique

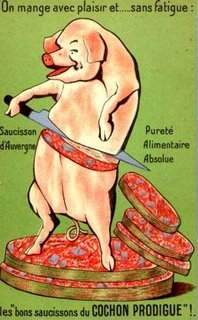
French advertisement for dry sausage from Auvergne (1919)

Suicide food is a visual marketing technique that involves presenting animals as if they wish to be eaten by humans or want to be directly involved with producing food products made for human consumption. These representations are generally anthropomorphized and portrayed in a colorful and joyful manner in direct contrast to the suffering of animals involved with buying and consuming products derived from them, such as meat, fish, and dairy products.

The aim of such a communication method is to relieve consumers of guilt by conveying the idea that animals would like to be eaten, making the technique a form of anthropocentrism and reification of the animal subject.

== Definition ==
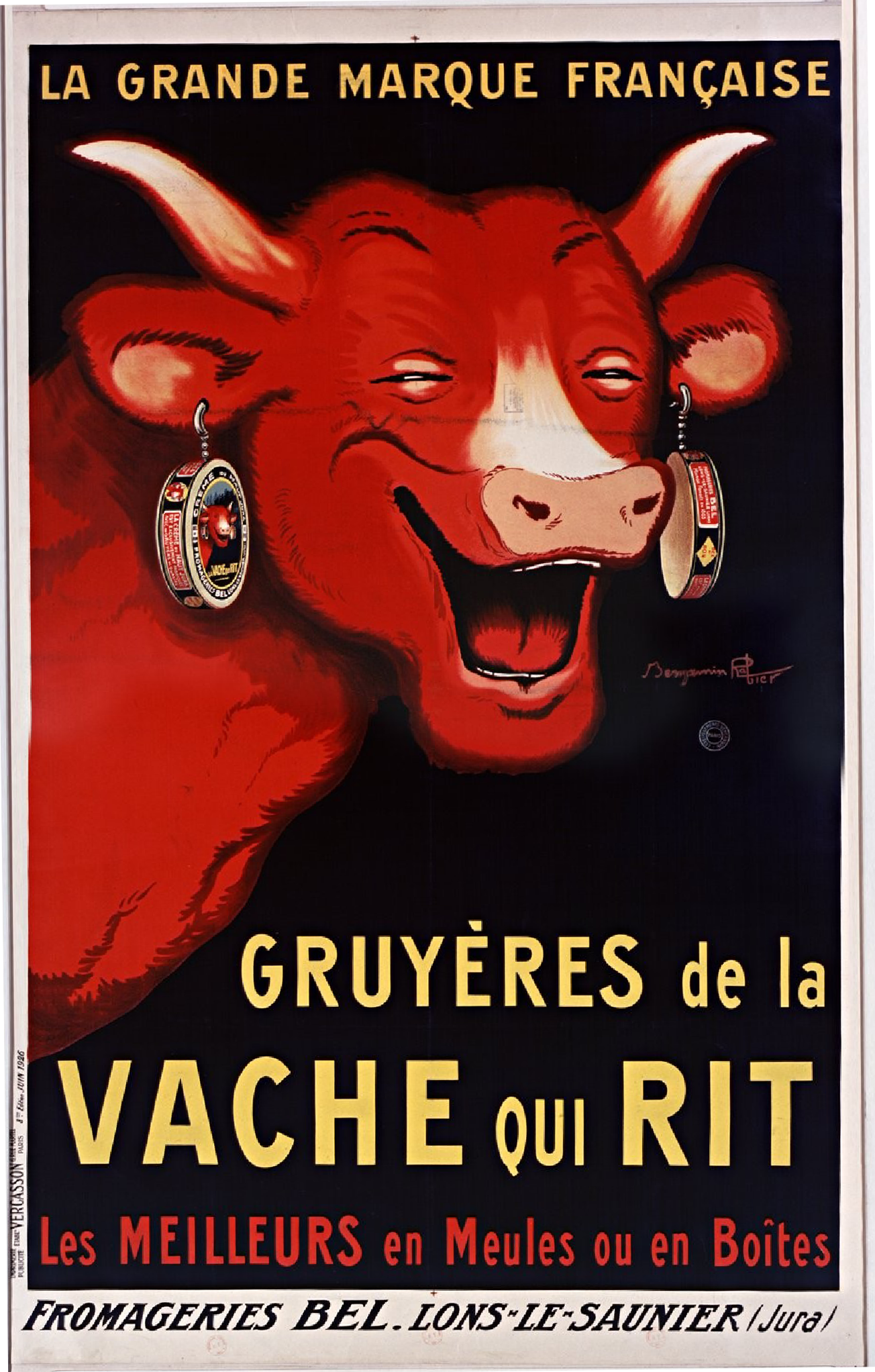
Advertisement for The Laughing Cow by Benjamin Rabier (1926)

Suicide food-related communication techniques are generally characterized by cheerful and colorful presentation.

Examples of suicide food advertisements and images include The Laughing Cow, a fish in a sailor suit showing off its biceps as part of the branding of the Croustibat fish product, a 1919 advertisement of a pig cutting itself up with a smile to produce dry sausage, a food commercial where chickens dance the can-can, or a plucked turkey basting itself with cooking juices in a dish.

== History ==
The term suicide food initially appeared in the early 2010s in the blog of an American vegan activist, Ben Grossblatt. Between 2006 and 2011, he documented numerous images of animals depicted "as if they wanted to be consumed".

In 2009, the advertisement for the Le Gaulois brand showing chickens dancing the can-can was accused of false advertising by the World Farm Animal Protection in a filed complaint. However, it was in 2022 that the denunciation of suicide food first gained momentum, in line with the general public's concerns about the impact of meat and dairy consumption on climate change. In December 2022, a French advertising ethics control body ruled against KFC for suicide food-associated false advertising based on an advertisement featuring a joyful representation of a chicken bouncing on the belly of a cow in a pastoral setting, which was described as attempting to mislead the viewer as to the real breeding conditions of the advertised animals consumed.

== Analysis ==
Suicide food is similar to the "absent referent" described by the American essayist Carol J. Adams, which in this context represents desire to break the link between the living animal and the consumer product in order to avoid making the consumer feeling guilty for consuming their product. Researchers Dan Dombrowski and Brianne Donaldson see it as an example of the representation of the animal in contemporary visual culture that degrades it to the rank of a consumer object intended solely for the pleasure of the human being. It is also an example of a totally anthropocentric visual construction of the animal world.

In 2022, the Quebec magazine Les Affaires questioned if future marketing campaigns would begin to moderate uses of suicide food imagery. The RTBF noted that the Croustibat logo had been altered from a fish to a genie, probably to avoid the reference to the animal making up the product for consumption.

== See also ==
- Food marketing
