= School fundraising =

School fundraising or school fund raising is the practice of raising money to support educational enrichment programs by schools or school groups such as parent-teacher organizations, parent-teacher associations and booster clubs. One of the most prevalent practices is product fundraising.

As of 2011, in the United States schools and other non-profits raised $1.7 billion each year by selling popular consumer items. Eight out of 10 Americans support these types of programs. In addition, schools and school groups such as their Parent Teacher Organization and Parent Teacher Association find many creative ways to raise funds—from bake sales, dinner events, auctions and school carnivals to more aggressive advertising, affinity programs, grant writing and straight forward donation requests.

== History ==
Door-to-door fundraising and in hand product fundraising sales (outside local stores) has been a regular part of societal activities since the early 1970s. However, in the United States door-to-door sales came under scrutiny in 1997 following the murder of an 11-year-old New Jersey boy who was killed while fundraising unsupervised in his neighborhood. Due to this fundraisers do not allow kids to go door to door. By the 1990s, most product sales were made to parents, family members, co-workers, friends and close neighbors. The fundraising industry strongly discourages unsupervised door-to-door sales.

== Product fundraisers ==
Product fundraising has its origins in the early 20th century. The practice typically involves the purchase and re-sale of popular consumer products by a non-profit group whereupon the group sponsoring the sale keeps a portion of the gross sales. Products can be purchased in bulk and paid for in advance by the organization, then re-sold to supporters. Products may also be ordered using a catalog, order forms and other methods. Supporters pay for the product when the order is placed or upon final delivery. Under some product fundraising models, the school or non-profit organization is required to pay for a fixed number of products in advance.

There are three types of product fundraisers that schools use to generate revenue. (1) Pre-sales Fundraising, (2) Product In-Hand Fundraising, (3) Online Fundraising, with online fundraising rising in popularity over the course of the past decade.

As of 2010, there are over a thousand fundraising companies in the United States offering their products and services to schools and their associated nonprofit parent teacher groups. In the past year, many changes have occurred in the school fundraising industry. A few online fundraising companies, like Piggybackr, are now using social media web apps, such as Facebook and Twitter, to make online fundraising easier for schools and the parents and students who promote them. Additionally, Fundraising Software is also now available allowing a school to have their own platform that makes it easy to engage students, parents, faculty, donors, and alumni with compelling communication campaigns.

== Self-organized school fundraisers ==
Other school fundraisers that generate substantial revenue for schools include auctions and raffles. With these types of fundraising activities, the school requests donations from local restaurants and businesses in their area, that are then offered at the event. In the case of an auction, people are allowed to bid on the dinner, limousine ride, or whatever was donated by the local businesses in the community. In the case of a raffle, people purchase raffle tickets that are then later picked randomly from a container. Often the donations are solicited by parents acting on behalf of the school, who make phone calls, write letters, or know of other parents who work for companies who may be willing to donate.

== Scrip fundraising ==
Scrip fundraising (now more commonly known as "gift card fundraising") offers an alternative to fundraisers that rely on selling products or raffle tickets. The scrip fundraising concept was pioneered by St. Vincent DePaul Parish in Petaluma CA in 1988, and quickly grew to a powerful fundraising method for schools across the US.

With scrip fundraising, retailers offer gift cards (“scrip”, or “substitute money”) at a discount to non-profit organizations. The non-profit organizations then sell the gift cards to member families at full face value. The families redeem the gift cards at full face value, and the discount or rebate is retained by the non-profit organization as revenue.

Scrip fundraising differs from other school fundraising programs because there is no selling. Families do their normal household shopping at scrip retailers with scrip gift cards. A family that regularly does their shopping with scrip gift cards can easily raise $500 to $1000 or more per year. Participating schools use these funds for field trips, scholarships, tuition assistance or fee reductions.

One persistent and basic question has been whether or not any portion of the funds that are raised through a scrip program and applied to a family’s tuition account should be considered taxable income to the parent who purchases the scrip. According to Research conducted by RaiseRight, scrip is a reduction in purchase price from the face value, and is in effect a rebate from the retailer, and as such is not considered gross income.

== Economic pressures ==
Some parents and schools are now having to resort to extensive fundraising, including in one case having to raise $300,000 in six months to close budget gaps in order to keep Cordova Lane Elementary School in Sacramento, California open.

Additionally, general economic hardships can cause school fundraisers to earn less, as volunteer time is spread thin with more families requiring dual incomes. A survey done by national fundraising association in 2007 determined that on average the most labor-intensive school wide fundraisers, in terms of the number of volunteers needed is school carnivals, with an average of 59 volunteers needed. Other labor-intensive fundraisers included: auctions (28), "thons" such as walk-a-thons (22), breakfasts or dinners (17) and raffles (17). By contrast the least labor-intensive fundraisers for schools included: product fundraisers (7), direct donations (7), restaurant nights (6) and student portraits (2). Another survey from the same source showed 71% of parents are "concerned and overwhelmed" with having to do more fundraisers.

There is concern about the disparity in how much parent groups can raise for their neighborhood schools exists throughout the United States, and debates over how — and whether — to narrow those gaps. In a push for more equity, some local communities have created mechanisms for redistributing parent donations between schools.

== See also ==
- School bus advertising
