= Pester power =

Children's influence on purchases

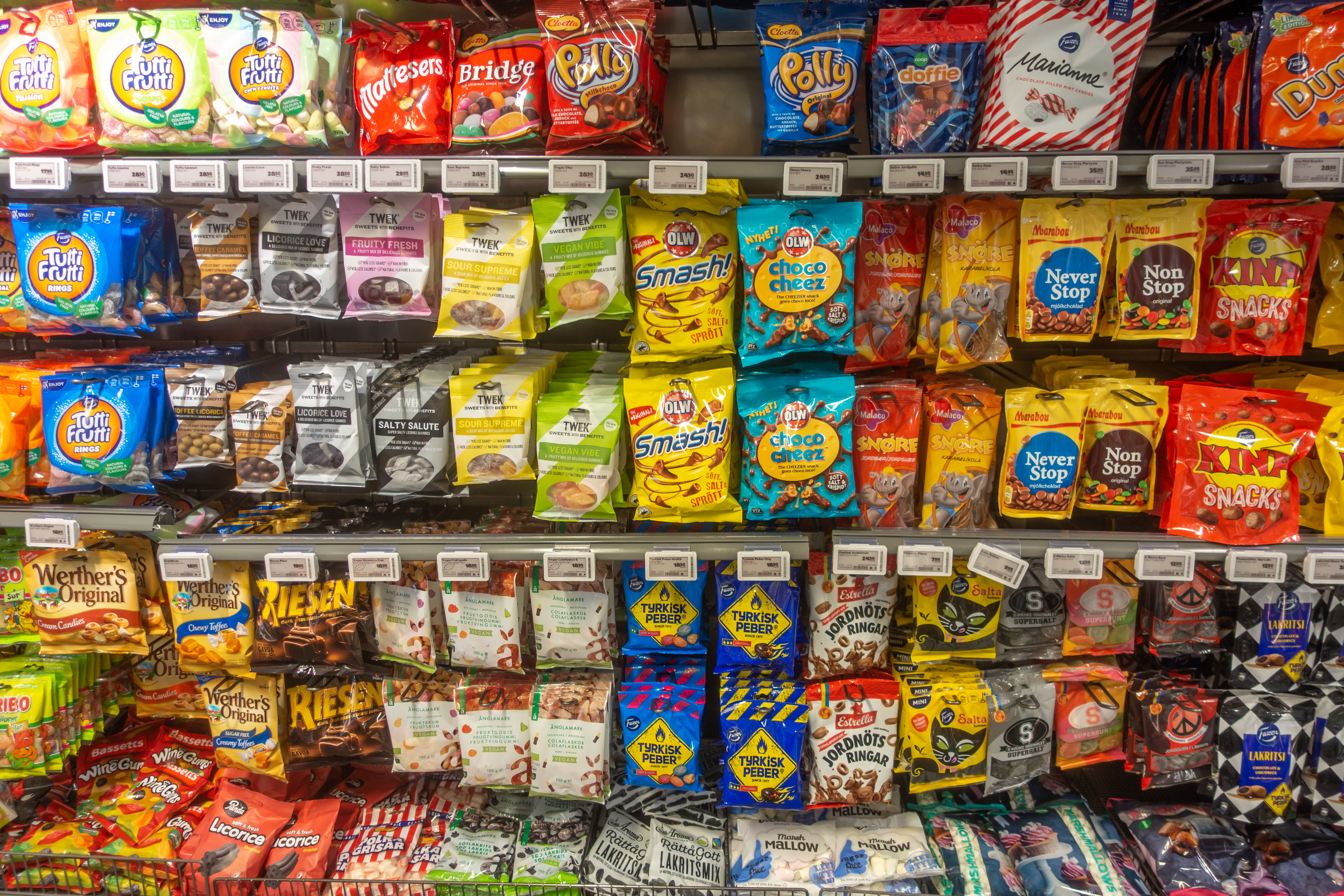
A selection of candy in a supermarket

"Pester power", or "the nag factor", as the phenomenon is known in U.S. literature, is the "tendency of children, who are bombarded with marketers' messages, to unrelentingly request advertised items". The phrase is used to describe the negative connotations of children's influence in their parents' buying habits.

Due to children's buying influence growing in line with average household income, some commentators now refer to the home as being a "filiarchy" due to the power that children may hold in the household's consumer choices. This makes pester power relevant for the modern household. Pester power is commonly used by marketing companies to target the 4–6 years old category as they have limited disposable income of their own, and consequently do not have the means to buy goods themselves.

The growth of the issue of pester power is directly related to the rise of child advertising. Mr. Potato Head was the first children's toy to be advertised on television; this aired in 1952 and paved the way for pester power, as pitching to children was seen to be an innovative new idea. It is now a convention for children's products to be directly marketed at children. Through pester power, children have assumed role of being the "ultimate weapon" in influencing family spending because of the how they consistently nag their parents. As a result, children have been likened to being a "Trojan horse" within the modern household for marketing companies.

One key criticism of pester power is that it implies repeated nagging by the child. However, young children may not be eloquent enough to have any other feasible methods of persuasion, and consequently the notion that adverts are specifically designed to encourage young children to nag could be argued not to be the case.

== Targeting ==
The average child in the United States sees more than 3,000 advertisements per day across a variety of different media forms (as of 1999) and the average Mexican Child will see 12,000 adverts for junk food every year. Consequently, different methodologies are employed in order to maximize a child's influence in a household's purchasing habits. Exploiting pester power as a marketing tool to try to influence buying habits can take more than one form, crucially as the "way a child nags isn't always the same". Indeed, there are a large array of different ways in which children can pester.

Studies identify different methods of nagging/pestering to try to achieve the marketers desired goal of the child influencing the parents to buy the product. In the 2011 issue of the Journal of Children and Media the three main types of nagging are identified as: juvenile nagging, nagging to test boundaries, and manipulative nagging. The trend was that both nagging as a whole and manipulative nagging significantly increasing with age.

Another study suggests that there are two main ways children pester their parents. The first method is persistent nagging, which is said to be "whiny": it involves the child trying to get what they want by being badly behaved until they succeed. This is contrasted with importance nagging, in which the child rationally demands the good and shows why that product is particularly important, for instance identifying the benefit of a specific toy in relation to others, for example completing a set.

These strategies are employed in different circumstances to try to circumvent various different types of parental guards against pestering. Joel Bakan, author of The Corporation: The Pathological Pursuit of Profit and Power, identifies four different parent types who can all be influenced in different ways. First are bare necessities parents, who are financially able to pander to the whims of the children; these parents are likely only to give in if the child can demonstrate a need or benefit of the product.

This contrasts with the three more easily influenced parent types, "Kids Pals", "Indulgers" and "Conflicteds". Kids Pals are identified as being relaxed and young, Indulgers seem to buy their children's affection, making up for their lack of parental contact time, and thirdly the Conflicteds who do not deliberately impulse buy, but continue to do so anyway; this group is more likely to submit to persistence. Indeed, when parents say 'no' they are often then subjected to family conflict and strife. The scale of the issue is widespread as 74% of households said that pester power impacted on their buying habits.

Furthermore, the age at which children are targeted is reducing, in a ploy to retain the child's loyalty as the child grows up to try to build a loyal buyer base. McNeal spoke of "brand name preference" being crucial from an early age, which is validated by Mike Searles, the former president of Toys "R" Us, who said "[I]f you own this child at an early age... you can own this child for years to come".

== Combating ==
One method of stopping pester power is in the home. In studies where mothers have been interviewed about their methods for limiting the effectiveness of pester power, 36% said "limiting commercial exposure" was effective whilst another 35% said explaining why the children could have not have the product was their preferred method to reduce the nagging.

Other than parental controls of pester power the other obvious way is banning child advertisement. For instance, Sweden and Norway forbid all advertising to those under 12, in Greece advertising toys is illegal until 10pm.

In Sweden, a notable example was that the Pokémon cartoon series had to mute its saying "gotta catch 'em all", as this was said to be stealth advertising and an attempt to influence children into pestering their parents to buy the playing cards for them. Stealth advertising is a threat as children who are younger than eight are unable to recognise whether there is an intent to sell a product. this presents problems when TV shows have their own lines of merchandise which are not explicitly advertised.

Indeed, in the UK the Advertising Standards Authority (ASA) condemned an advert by Morrisons in 2011 which featured children being able to win a chance to visit Disneyland when their parents shopped at Morrisons. This later was stopped on the grounds that the advert showed children pestering their parents to take them to Morrisions and it was feared that the children could mimic these actions. In the UK no advert is permitted "to encourage [children] to ask their parents, guardians or other person to buy or enquire about a product or service for them"; this is an example of UK legislation directly attempting to combat pester power.

== Concerns ==
A key concern of pester power is its effect on childhood obesity. As the products which are promoted to children are pre-sugared cereals, soft drinks, savoury snacks, confectionery and fast food, which in turn are some of the most calorie-dense of all food articles. Indeed, 63% of the U.S. marketing budget for children was spent on carbonated beverages, fast foods and cereals. The World Health Organisation said "it is probable that the heavy advertising of fast foods and energy dense foods and drinks increases the consumption of those products".

Dina Borzekowski from Bloomberg School's Department of health recommended, "[T]o address childhood obesity, it may be necessary to limit the amount of food and beverage advertising shown on commercial television and other media, as this may lessen children's nagging for unhealthy items."

Conversely Lawlor and Prothero argue that the "parent–child interaction" when concerning buying habits is not as large a problem as it can be perceived to be, or indeed, maybe it is predictable in a family environment, where conflicting interests are expected.

Some drivers of pester power in various countries are:

- More working women and consequently more dual income families.
- Grandparents' increasing role in bringing up children because of working mothers. Grandparents are the fastest-growing income sources for the children.
- Rise in the number of single parent households. Research supports that children in single parent households make their first purchases almost a year earlier than their two-parent household counterparts.
- Delayed parenthood.
- Greater exposure to kids: there is an ever-increasing exposure to kids both in terms of technology and mass media.
- The pang and guilt of not being able to spend much quality time with children is compensated by smothering them with material goods.
- Hurried child syndrome and hyper-parenting: parents today overscheduled their children's life with a heavy dose of academics and extracurricular activities, forcing the little adults to excel both at school and extra academics.
- The "askable" parent: communication between parents and children has opened up considerably and the stereotypical roles have become rarer.
- Growth of retail sector.
- Kids channels: a newer phenomenon.
