= Children's Advertising Review Unit =

Self-regulatory American children's advertising organization

CARU
- Type: non-profit organization
- Industry: Advertising
- Founded: 1974
- Headquarters: United States
- Parent: BBB National Programs
- Website: http://www.bbbprograms.org/CARU

The Children’s Advertising Review Unit (CARU) is a U.S. self-regulatory organization that was established in 1974 and is administered by BBB National Programs. It is an independent self-regulatory agency for the promotion of responsible advertising and privacy practices to children under the age of 13 in all media. CARU reviews and evaluates child-directed media for truth, accuracy, appropriateness, and sensitivity to children’s still developing cognitive abilities in accordance with its Self-Regulatory Guidelines for Children's Advertising, privacy guidelines, and relevant laws.

CARU monitors advertisements found in all media including broadcast and cable TV, radio, children’s magazines, comic books, the Internet, mobile services, influencers, and more for compliance with its Guidelines. When ads are found to be misleading, inaccurate, or inconsistent with its Guidelines, CARU seeks changes through voluntary cooperation and where relevant, enforcement action. The results of CARU inquiries are publicly recorded in the NAD/CARU Case Reports. CARU also handles advertiser challenges and consumer complaints.

In 1996, CARU added a section to its Guidelines that highlight issues that are unique to the Internet including Websites directed at children under age 13 for online privacy. These Guidelines served as the basis of the federal Children's Online Privacy Protection Act of 1998 (COPPA).

In January 2001, CARU's self-regulatory program became the first Federal Trade Commission-approved Safe Harbor under COPPA. Participants who adhere to CARU's Guidelines are deemed in compliance with COPPA and essentially insulated from FTC enforcement action as long as they comply with program requirements.

CARU, operating under the principle that self-regulation is best supported by education, provides a general advisory service for advertisers and agencies and has created publications to help parents help their kids understand advertising.

CARU has an Advisory Board, composed of leading experts in education, communications, child development and nutrition, as well as industry leaders. The Board advises on general issues concerning children’s advertising and assists in the continuous development of the Guidelines.

In July 2021, CARU released revised Advertising Guidelines that went into effect on January 1, 2022. The revisions address in-app advertising, influencers, and diversity and inclusion.

On August 23, 2022, CARU issued a Compliance Warning Regarding Advertising Practices Directed to Children in the Metaverse.

== CARU’s Advertising Guidelines ==
CARU's Advertising Guidelines are subjective, they go beyond accuracy and consider impressionable and vulnerable child audience.

The Advertising Guidelines are based upon the following core principles:

1. Advertisers have special responsibilities when advertising to children or collecting data from children online. They should take into account the limited knowledge, experience, sophistication and maturity of the audience to which the message is directed. They should recognize that younger children have a limited capacity to evaluate the credibility of information, may not understand the persuasive intent of advertising, and may not even understand that they are being subject to advertising.
2. Advertising should be neither deceptive nor unfair, as these terms are applied under the Federal Trade Commission Act, to the children to whom it is directed.
3. Advertisers should have adequate substantiation for objective advertising claims, as those claims are reasonably interpreted by the children to whom they are directed.
4. Advertising should not stimulate children’s unreasonable expectations about product quality or performance.
5. Products and content inappropriate for children should not be advertised directly to them.
6. Advertisers should avoid social stereotyping and appeals to prejudice, and are encouraged to incorporate minority and other groups in advertisements and to present positive role models whenever possible.
7. Advertisers are encouraged to capitalize on the potential of advertising to serve an educational role and influence positive personal qualities and behaviors in children, e.g., being honest and respectful of others, taking safety precautions, engaging in physical activity.
8. Although there are many influences that affect a child’s personal and social development, it remains the prime responsibility of the parents to provide guidance for children. Advertisers should contribute to this parent-child relationship in a constructive manner.

In July 2021, CARU issued revised guidelines for responsible advertising to children which went into effect January 1, 2022. The core principles of the CARU Advertising Guidelines remained the same, but the revised Guidelines:

1. Move beyond television-centric to address and reflect today’s digital advertising environment.
2. Contain a new section dedicated to in-app and in-game advertising and purchases.
3. Contain a new guideline requiring that advertising not portray or encourage negative social stereotyping, prejudice, or discrimination.
4. Incorporate updated FTC guidance on endorsements and influencer marketing.
5. Apply to children under age 13 across all child-directed content no matter the platform. The previous Guidelines applied primarily to children under age 12.
6. More clearly spell out the factors that determine when an ad is primarily directed to children under age 13.
7. Remove the children’s privacy guidelines, included in the CARU Advertising Guidelines since 1996, to a separate document, the CARU Self-Regulatory Guidelines for Children’s Online Privacy Protection.
