= Marketing in schools =

Marketing in schools is a widespread phenomenon in which schools sign contracts allowing certain businesses to conduct marketing activities in school facilities — primarily advertising. For example, a school might allow only one brand of soft drink to be sold in vending machines on the campus; in return, the soft drink company would provide compensation to the school (frequently money, but it may provide other compensation as well, such as building new facilities or paying for school supplies). The phrase usually refers to arrangements by elementary schools or high schools, rather than higher education; because this marketing is seen as targeting children, it is very controversial. One example of this is Channel One News, a TV show, branded as educational, shown in schools that shows two minutes of advertising. Channel One is shown in over 11,500 middle and high schools across the United States, reaching 7.7 million students.

Many find the practice objectionable. Some argue that it can encourage unhealthy behaviour in children; for example, the drinking of soda or the consumption of fast food. More generally, some people object to the entire concept of marketing to children, fearing that they are easier to influence and that this marketing is unethical, or that it interferes with the values they may wish to teach their child. The practice has come in for harsh criticism especially from many on the political left; for example, the magazine Adbusters has run numerous features attacking the practice. Many schools defend the practice, noting that it is a source of valuable revenue, allowing programs that might otherwise go unfunded.

== See also ==
- Advertising in schools
- Marketing of schools
- Fast food advertising
