= Food marketing =

Promotion of food for sale

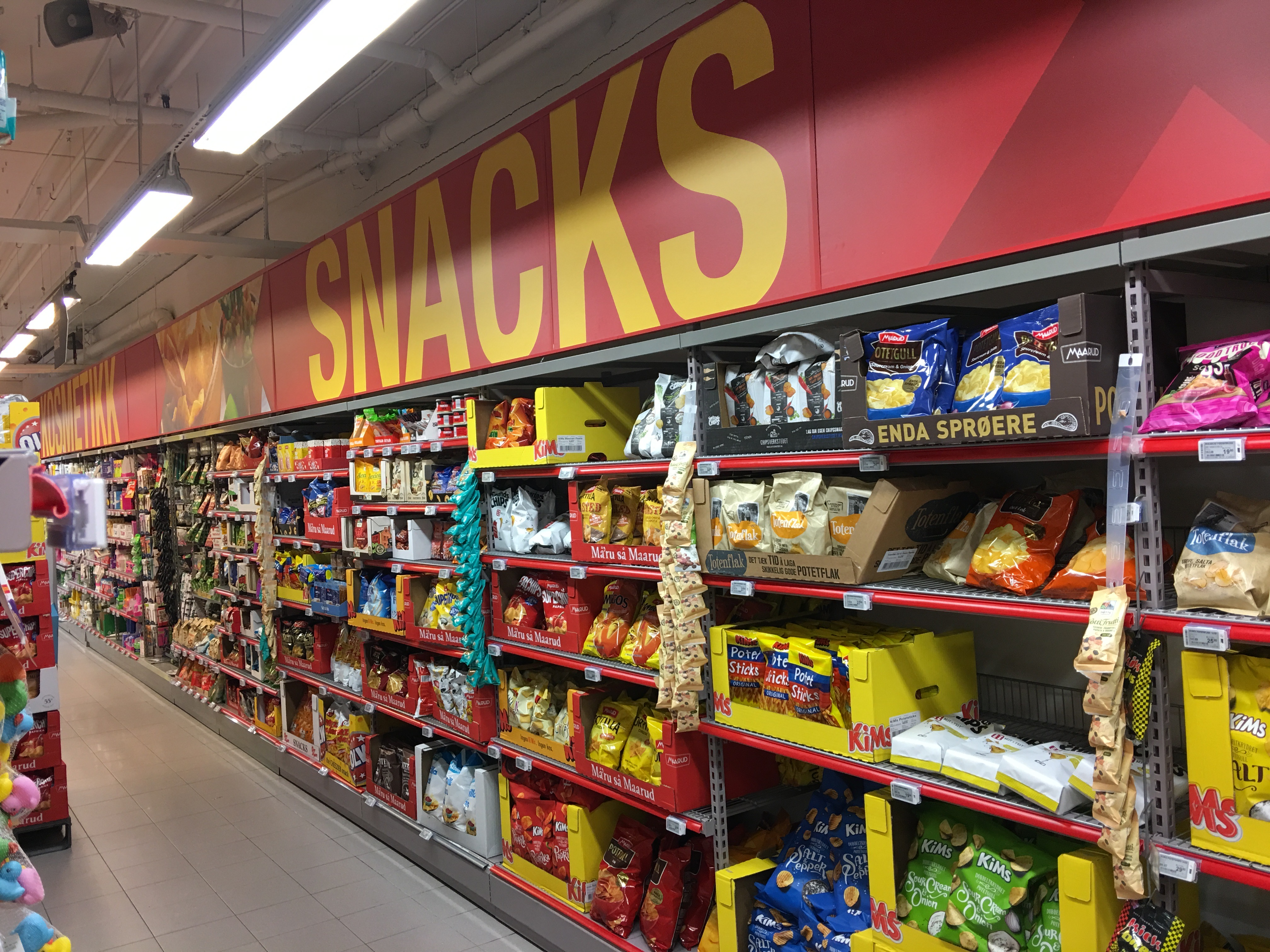
Snack food for sale in a Norwegian supermarket

Food marketing is the marketing of food products. It brings together the food producer and the consumer through a chain of marketing activities.

== Background ==
Pomeranz & Adler (2015) define food marketing as a chain of marketing activities that takes place within the food system between a food organisation and the consumer. This has the potential to be a complicated procedure, as there are many processes that are used before the sale the food product. These include food processing, wholesaling, retailing, food service and transport. Due to these many processes, a multitude of organisations have to be involved in the sale of one food product. For example, there are approximately fifty-six organisations are involved in the making of one can of chicken noodle soup. These organisations not only include the processors who make the ingredients for the product, but also involve the companies who manufacture the cans, print the labels and transport the product. Therefore, on a global scale, the food marketing industry is one of the largest direct and indirect employers.

For Schaffner & Schroder, 1998, food marketing is the act of communicating to the consumer through a range of marketing techniques in order to add value to a food product and persuade the consumer to purchase. This includes all activities that occur between the completion of a product through to the purchasing process of consumers. Food marketing systems differ worldwide due to the level of development in the particular country, economically and technologically. Understanding and interpreting a particular countries food marketing techniques also requires taking into account the socio-economic, cultural, legal-political and technological environment of that country.

== History ==
There are three historical phases of food marketing: the fragmentation phase (before 1870–1880), the unification phase (1880–1950), and the segmentation phase (1950 and later).

=== United States ===
==== Fragmentation phase (pre-1870–1880) ====
In the fragmentation phase, the United States was divided into numerous geographic fragments because transporting food was expensive, leaving most production, distribution, and selling locally based.

==== Unification phase (1880–1950) ====
In the unification phase, distribution was made possible by railroads, coordination of sales forces was made possible by the telegraph and telephone, and product consistency was made possible by advances in manufacturing. This new distribution system was led by meat processors such as Armour and Swift in midwestern cities and by companies such as Heinz, Quaker Oats, Campbell Soup, and Coca-Cola, which sold their brands nationally. Advertising in print media and direct marketing through demonstrations at stores and public venues were among the prime marketing tools. The initial Crisco campaign, in 1911, was an example.

==== Segmentation phase (1950 to current) ====
In the segmentation phase (1950 and later) radio, television and internet advertising made it possible for a wider range of competing products to focus on different benefits and images and thus appeal to different demographic and psychographic markets. Distribution via the new national road system strengthened national brands.

== Marketing mix ==
The four components of food marketing are often called the "four Ps" of the marketing mix because they relate to product, price, promotion, and place. One reason food manufacturers receive the largest percentage of the retail food dollar is that they provide the most differentiating, value-added service. The money that manufacturers invest in developing, pricing, promotion, and placing their products helps differentiate a food product based on both quality and brand-name recognition. Overall, the marketing mix can add value to a food organisation's product.

=== Product ===
In deciding what type of new food products a consumer would most prefer, a manufacturer can either try to develop a new food product or try to modify or extend an existing food. For example, a sweet, flavored yogurt drink would be a new product, but milk in a new flavor (such as chocolate strawberry) would be an extension of an existing product. There are three steps to both developing and extending: generate ideas, screen ideas for feasibility, and test ideas for appeal. Only after these steps will a food product make it to the national market. Of one hundred new food product ideas that are considered, only six make it to a supermarket shelf.

The food industry faces numerous marketing decisions. Money can be invested in brand building (through advertising and other forms of promotion) to increase either quantity demanded or the price consumers are willing to pay for a product. Coca-Cola, for example, spends a great deal of money both on perfecting its formula and on promoting the brand. This allows Coke to charge more for its product than can makers of regional and smaller brands.

Manufacturers may be able to leverage their existing brand names by developing new product lines. For example, Heinz started as a brand for pickles but branched out into ketchup. Some brand extensions may involve a risk of damage to the original brand if the quality is not good enough. Coca-Cola, for example, refused to apply the Coke name to a diet drink back when artificial sweeteners had a significantly less attractive taste. Coke created Tab Cola, but only when aspartame (NutraSweet) was approved for use in soft drinks did Coca-Cola come out with a Diet Coke.

Manufacturers that have invested a great deal of money in brands may have developed a certain level of consumer brand loyalty—that is, a tendency for consumers to continue to buy a preferred brand even when an attractive offer is made by competitors. For loyalty to be present, it is not enough to merely observe that the consumer buys the same brand consistently. The consumer, to be brand loyal, must be able to actively resist promotional efforts by competitors. A brand loyal consumer will continue to buy the preferred brand even if a competing product is improved, offers a price promotion or premium, or receives preferred display space. Some consumers have multi-brand loyalty. Here, a consumer switches between a few preferred brands. The consumer may either alternate for variety or may, as a rule of thumb, buy whichever one of the preferred brands is on sale. This consumer, however, would not switch to other brands on sale. Brand loyalty is, of course, a matter of degree. Some consumers will not switch for a moderate discount, but would switch for a large one or will occasionally buy another brand for convenience or variety.

The product of the marketing mix refers to the goods and/or services that the organisation will offer to the consumer. An organisation can achieve this by either creating a new food product, or by modifying or improving an existing food product. For example, an organic almond yoghurt drink would be considered a new product, whereas a chocolate-flavoured milk drink would be an extension of an existing product. The three steps to develop and extend a food product include generating ideas, analysing the ideas for feasibility and testing ideas for demand. Once these steps have successfully been completed, the food product can then be manufactured for the food market.

=== Price ===
In profitably pricing the food, the manufacturer must keep in mind that the retailer adds approximately 50 percent to the price of a wholesale product. For example, a frozen food sold in a retail store for $4.50 generates an income of $3.00 for the manufacturer. This money has to pay for the cost of producing, packaging, shipping, storing, and selling the product.

Price encompasses the amount of money paid by the consumer in order to purchase the food product. When pricing food products, the manufacturer must bear in mind that the retailer will add a particular percentage to the price on the wholesale product. This percentage amount differs globally. The percentage is used to pay for the cost of producing, packaging, shipping, storing and selling the food product. For example, the purchasing of a food product in a supermarket selling for $3.50 generates an income of $2.20 for the manufacturer.

=== Promotion ===
Promoting a food to consumers is done out of store, in store, and on package. Advertisements on television and in magazines are attempts to persuade consumers to think favorably about a product, so that they go to the store to purchase the product. In addition to advertising, promotions can also include Sunday newspaper ads that offer coupons such as cents-off and buy-one-get-one-free offers.

In the 1950s, entrepreneur Frieda Rapoport Caplan revolutionized the fresh produce industry by introducing packaging and labeling of fresh fruits and vegetables.

=== Place ===
Place refers to the distribution and warehousing efforts necessary to move a food from the manufacturer to a location where a consumer can buy it. It can also refer to where the product is located in a retail outlet (e.g., the end of an aisle; the top, bottom, or middle shelf; in a special display case, etc.)

The food marketing system in the United States is a flexible one. Consumer focus helps marketers anticipate the demands of consumers, and production focus helps them respond to changes in the market. The result is a system that meets and influences the ever-changing demands of consumers.

Place refers to the activities that organisations undertake in order to make their food product available to their consumers. This encompasses the distribution necessary to move a food product from the manufacturer to a location where it can be purchased by the consumer. Product location in a store is also a definition of place in the marketing mix. For example, a particular place in an aisle, a shelf or a display in a supermarket.

== Segmentation ==
In order to market its food products, an organisation must first understand whether its product will satisfy the consumer's needs better than competitors do. To achieve this, an organisation must understand the four types of segmentation.

=== Geographic ===
An organisation must understand where it is marketing its food products in a geographical sense. Clarifying this will help an organisation to grasp which food products will satisfy the needs of a particular consumer culture. For example, researching whether the consumer lives in America or Asia; or, whether the consumer lives in a city or a rural area. By understanding these aspects, the organisation will be able to identify that a consumer's food needs differ depending on where they live.

=== Demographic ===
A food organisation must understand the demographic segment that it will be marketing towards. Factors that must be considered are a consumer's age, gender, education, social class, income, religion and ethnicity. All of these aspects can impact whether the consumer will prefer one food product over another.

=== Psychographic ===
A food organisation must understand its consumer psychographic. Factors such as lifestyle, personality, opinions, activities and interests of its potential consumers must be considered. Identifying these aspects can help an organisation to improve its food products.

=== Behaviour ===
A food organisation must understand how its consumers may behave towards a food product. For example, researching the benefits they seek, the frequency of purchase, attitudes towards the food product, and their nutritional knowledge can be beneficial.

== Criticism ==
In recent years, food marketing has been criticised by professionals as being a major factor in contributing to childhood obesity. In 2006, M Nestle suggested that food marketing purposely targets children who are easily influenced at such a young age to eat high-sugar drinks and food with little nutritional benefit. The fact that areas of food marketing are linked to obesity is concerning, as well as how easy it is to market to children and affect their food choices. Television and print media still stand as the traditional communication channels for food marketing, but other popular approaches are also more prevalent these days. These include the Internet, toys, packaging, video games, blockbuster films, character licensing of children's toys and celebrity advertising. The employment of these food marketing strategies are growing, and are said to be partly responsible for swelling rates of childhood obesity.

Product placement in children's films and television shows gives food marketers more power to get children familiar with their brand and to directly interact with this market segment. The power brands have through food marketing on television is significant because television audiences automatically are more enticed by an advertisement as it is playing in front of them, forming stronger predispositions for brands. Accusations come into play when this saturation happens as children are not equipped with adequate knowledge to make smart nutritional choices, and food marketing is therefore sometimes blamed for children's unhealthy lifestyles. Children are a fast-expanding market segment, firstly because they yield influence over their parents' buying, but also because they are future consumers themselves. Food marketers capitalize on the fact that most children trouble their parents for a product they have seen on television until they receive it, giving children high bargaining power. According to McGinnis et al. in 2006, by the time children are two years old, the majority can identify brands in supermarkets and demand them by name. It has been argued that marketers also portray some foods to children as exclusive only to them, implying children know better about their nutrition than their parents. This has in turn seen trends of children disregarding parental advice and taking it upon themselves to pick and choose what they eat.

Food marketers also use appealing packaging to attract children to their product through bright colours, including toys in schemes (McDonald's Happy Meals with a toy included is an example) and utilising famous television or film characters to spark interest. In terms of packaging, brands will also change the size of products to entice children. Large companies have further been criticised for contributing to obesity through supplying schools with branded sponsorships and sports merchandise such as rugby balls that flaunt a company's logo. Food marketers are criticised further for being responsible for child obesity rates, and are said to not have children's long-term physical wellbeing in mind when they aim to rapidly create brand name association among children.

A report from Global Health Advocacy Incubator documents the food industry's strategies to defeat warning labels on ultra-processed food products (UPP).

=== Childhood obesity ===
It has been shown through Frechette's studies published in 2015 that in recent years, as children and teenagers have become more exposed to technological advances, they have become more susceptible to unhealthy food marketing commercial messages from food organisations. In 2009, Harris, Pomeranz, Lobstein, & Brownell suggested that food marketers have been using child-targeting marketing practices to persuade children to eat unhealthy or poorly suitable foods. Organisations achieve this through direct and indirect marketing tactics on television adverts, games, social media and food packaging. These tactics have an explicit effect on children's consumption patterns, diet-related health, nutritional knowledge, purchase behaviour and preferences. Overall, it has been found that food marketing is one of the leading contributors to an increase in childhood obesity. This is increasingly becoming a global issue.

In order to prevent the current unhealthy food marketing culture, Sacks, Mialon, Vandevijvere, Trevena, Snowdon, Crino & Swinburn believe that there are methods and policies that should be put into place by governments. Firstly, parents should be informed of the nutritional values of the foods that they are giving to their children. For example, an easy-to-read nutritional label on food packaging that provides the nutrient values and their definitions. This will create healthier food environments for families around the world. Secondly, parents could restrict which advertisements that their children are exposed to. For example, parents could use ad-blocking applications or limit television watching time. Through the implementation of these strategies, governments can contribute to decreasing the rates of childhood obesity through food marketing.

The World Health Organization published a report which highlights that food marketing is especially prevalent where children are and what they watch on TV. Predominantly promoting ultra-processed food which includes sugar-sweetened beverages, and chocolate and confectionery. It confirms food marketing is pervasive, persuasive and bad for health.

=== Misleading nutritional information ===
To persuade consumers to buy food products, organisations may present misleading nutritional information on their food products. It has become more prevalent that food organisations are not entirely transparent regarding what is contained in their food products. For example, saturated fats, sodium and added sugars. Wording such as "less sugar", "fat free" and "all natural" lead consumers to believe that the foods they are consuming are healthy. In 2015, Sacks et al. discussed that to prevent misleading food advertising, governments should implement policies regarding the placement of verified nutritional values on food packaging. The U.S. Food And Drug Administration redesigned the Nutrition Labeling and Education Act in 2016 which gave information to consumers about total calories, serving size, and nutrients. Food Standards Australia New Zealand has a similar Food Standards Code but misleading food labels remain.

In the United States, regulation of food marketing terms such as "healthy" are not well understood by the public. The Food and Drug Administration attempted to regulate the use of the term healthy in 2016 with a proposed rulemaking that resulted in an updated rule in 2022, which acknowledged that the current definition of the term allows food products to bear the claim "healthy" even when they "contain levels of nutrients that would not help consumers maintain healthy dietary practices." Consequently, FDA is proposing to define "healthy" using a "food group-based approach" in combination with limits on certain nutrients (saturated fat, sodium, and added sugars) to align use of the term with current nutrition science, the updated Nutrition Facts label, and the recommendations included in the Dietary Guidelines for Americans, 2020– 2025.

== Purchasing decisions ==
Food marketing not only involves the marketing of products to consumers, but the reasons why consumers purchase these items and the factors influencing such choices. Demographics, values and attitudes, incentives, and price willingness to pay are all elements that drive buyer selection in the marketing of food.

Firstly, food marketers must be aware that the attitudes and values of their target market play a significant role in what they choose to buy. For example, in terms of the green brand market, consumers will first be environmentally conscious and therefore intend to buy such products. Once a product has been marketed to a consumer, they need to feel that they are contributing to the preservation of the environment to purchase something. Consumers who have a concern for the environment tend to alter their behavior to be more environmentally friendly. Values and attitudes have been found to be the driving force of sustainable purchasing behavior. Marketers need to convey to their consumer market through information that some items have adverse effects on the environment. Brands need to also relay the values of food marketing to customers when communicating with them.

In relation to knowledge and beliefs in variables affecting food marketing decisions, it has been suggested that someone's understanding of products helps anticipate their ecologically friendly actions. Because a person's awareness of information can cause them to make more informed or less informed decisions about products shows knowledge is a major factor in consumer buying choices. When strategists are in food marketing, it is important to create binding relationships with potential customers through understanding their beliefs and awareness about the marketed product.

Demographics play a large role in determining the background of consumers and how food marketing operates. Age allows a brand to market its food towards certain age groups according to their wants. Education also comes into play because often education is associated with people buying better food. Income alike sees if people have more disposable income to spend on good products. Gender further allows food marketers to target women especially because women have been found to do the majority of food shopping in families.

Signage conveys a lot about a brand, for example what type of food they sell, the ingredients, where it was made and the cost of the products. Signage precisely communicates with the buyer and is an essential way to affect feelings and brain processes of a person. Findings show that certain digital signposting of a brand influences consumer perception and behavior towards a product, meaning food marketing strategies like this are very effective in brand positioning.

Lastly, consumer price willingness to pay is another tool used in food marketing to track how much a person is prepared to pay for a product. Marketers can take note of people's readiness to pay to see if they would indeed buy their product. Studies have shown that consumers are prepared to spend more on an item if it is environmentally friendly and portrays them as having sustainable behavior in society. Additionally, it has been explored that consumers will for example pay substantially more (almost 50%) for food produce that is said to be grown locally as opposed to grown in the wider country or imported. This is vital information when it comes to food marketing and helps companies make informed decisions about their food marketing strategies.

== Food marketing via sponsorships ==
Corporate spending on sponsorship worldwide grew 5.1% in 2015 reaching $57.5 billion, with the biggest spenders on sponsorships being food and beverage giants PepsiCo and Coca-Cola, spending $350m and $290m respectively. Professional sporting events are primary targets for food companies when utilising sponsorship as a form of marketing communication; however sports organisations are increasingly demanding high prices for access to their exploitable marketing rights. Food and beverage company MillerCoors were willing to spend $3.8m for a 30-second commercial during Super Bowl XLVII. Global food brand have also been seen to increase their marketing effort through sponsorships of amateur sporting events. In 2010 Yum! Brands paid $13.5m to name a university basketball stadium the 'bucket', creating the KFC stadium; similarly Papa John's purchased the naming rights of a college stadium for $5M. Food companies are also investing millions into individual athletes in return for access to their exploitable commercial potential. Peyton Manning reportedly earns $10M per year from sponsorship alone, with the highest percentage of sponsorship coming from Papa John's and Gatorade; similarly Kobe Bryant's sponsorship from McDonald's was reportedly worth $12M.

=== Ethics of sponsorship strategies ===
With regard to marketing according to Liaw and Tam in 2015, ethics deals with the moral principles behind the operation of marketing. The main ethical issue surrounding sponsorship being utilised as a form of marketing communication by food companies is the sponsorship of sport from perceived unhealthy food and beverage companies, such as McDonald's and Coca-Cola's sponsorship of the Olympics. Although different in many ways, similarities have been drawn between the marketing practices of tobacco companies and the food industry. At major sporting events, customers are exposed to a multitude of food-related sponsorships, with sponsorship associated with products classed as unhealthy twice as common as those classed as healthy (32.7% versus 15.5%). Sponsorships of sport from food or beverage companies that are perceived as unhealthy pose great health concern, often being cited as a contributing factor leading to an energy-dense and nutrient-poor diet.

Other ethical concerns with sponsorship being used as a marketing tactic by food companies include; the specific targeting of youths, sponsorship from alcohol brands and the misconceptions created through sponsorships by energy drink brands such as Red Bull.

== Via social media and its influences ==
Social media platforms are an effective way for food marketers to enter or attract a market. 'Social media' refers to websites such as Facebook and Twitter, and apps such as Instagram and Facebook. These websites allow users to upload and share content such as information, pictures, opinions and recommendations with the touch of a button. Food companies use unique marketing techniques designed to connect with the consumer such as running competitions, holding free giveaways and creating interactive games and apps. The benefits of these techniques are distinctive to social media platforms, as they interact and engage with the consumer on a level that other traditional media platforms are not capable.

== Supermarket catalogues, product placement and their involvement ==
A study of supermarket catalogues distributed globally has also yielded information which supports the claim that food advertising is contributing to rising global obesity levels, especially in countries where the advertising is more prominent, consistent and persuasive. The study concluded with the findings that supermarket catalogues have a major influence on the purchasing decisions and patterns of consumers. For example, countries with the most consistent, regular catalogues filled with unhealthy foods were among those testing highest for obesity as well. The study also noted that India and the Philippines were the only countries analysed that advertised a vast majority of healthy foods over unhealthy options.

Product placement is another food marketing technique that draws the consumer in and encourages them to purchase. Vending machines and pop-up sample booths are model examples of product placement techniques used by food marketers. Vending machines provide convenience to the consumer as they are usually stationed in areas with no larger food options nearby, such as university campuses and gyms. Consumers using vending machines will usually pay a slightly higher price for the item, and will usually not be concerned as the price difference accounts for the convenience provided to them.

== Issues ==
There are no set worldwide food marketing laws or legislation; therefore countries have the option to adopt their own legislation with regards to food marketing standards. These standards are usually based on the values, culture and ethics of the particular country. Many countries worldwide have created laws to limit food marketing towards children with the goal of reducing rising obesity levels. Obesity has been proven to have increased significantly with a link to the increase of food marketing and advertising in society.

Following a 'call out' from the Worldwide Health Organisation in 2006, many countries adopted changes to marketing laws and legislation in order to protect children from persuasive advertisements directly targeted at them. These advertisements are strategically designed with special techniques in order to attract the children's attention.

The Chilean Government has taken some of the most drastic steps in 2012 by approving the 'Law of Nutritional Composition of Food and Advertising'. This law gives strict guidelines for food marketers, allowing no high in saturated fat, sodium and sugar products to be advertised to under 14 year olds or through television or websites with an audience or more than 20% children. Iran has also taken similar actions, having banned the advertisement of all soft drinks since 2004. Iran's Ministry of Health and Medical Education has also prepared a document in 2015 containing 24 items in which they hope to prohibit the advertising of in future. Dibb and Lobstein acknowledge that traditional media outlets only account for approximately 20% of a food marketer's budget, therefore children are still highly exposed to influential advertising in shopping malls and grocery stores, vending machines, sponsored toys, contests etc.

In addition to Iran and Chile's more extensive legislation, over 30 countries worldwide have all adopted some form of legislation to protect children and reduce their exposure to advertisements. Some of these countries include Australia, Europe, Canada, Malaysia and Korea. An example of the type of clauses in the legislation includes prohibiting the use of certain marketing techniques such as using cartoon characters, which can be used to access a child's mind and gain their attention. Using psychological techniques such as this can be ethically wrong as well as illegal in some countries.

Advertising to children at a young age is a well-established food marketing technique designed to encourage brand preference and holds many ethical dilemmas. Previous studies have concluded that children can recognize and mentally picture brand logos at the age of just six months old, and will verbally request brands at the age of 3 years. (As reported by The Campaign for a Commercial-Free Childhood). Marketing professor James McNeal acknowledged "The Drool Factor" – a study which recognized the fact that babies naturally stare down at their bibs while drooling to see where their drool lands. Customizing baby bibs with brand logos has become an effective way for food marketers to imprint their brand into the child's lifestyle, targeting them at a vulnerable young age resulting in brand recognition from the child. As a result, when the child is older they will continue to reciprocate warm, fond feelings towards the brand when encountering it in society. This is seen as unethical in many countries and is why organisations such as 'The Campaign for a Commercial-free Childhood' exist and what they aim to reduce.

== See also ==
- Adolescents and food marketing
- Agricultural marketing
- Agricultural value chain
- Alcohol advertising
- Consumer Goods Forum
- Fish marketing
- Fast food advertising
- Food politics
- Shrimp marketing
- Sports drinks
- Suicide food, a visual marketing technique
- Ultra-processed food
- Wholesale marketing of food
