= BBB National Programs =

American non-profit

- Type: 501(c)(6) non-profit organization
- Industry: Advertising; Privacy
- Founded: 1971
- Headquarters: McLean, VA
- Services: Industry self-regulation; Dispute Resolution
- Website: https://www.bbbprograms.org, https://www.industryselfregulation.org

BBB National Programs, an independent non-profit organization that oversees more than a dozen national industry self-regulation programs that provide third-party accountability and dispute resolution services to companies, including outside and in-house counsel, consumers, and others in arenas such as privacy, advertising, data collection, child-directed marketing, and more. The Center for Industry Self-Regulation (CISR) is BBB National Programs' 501(c)(3) non-profit foundation. CISR supports responsible business leaders in developing fair, future-proof best practices, and the education of the public on the conditions necessary for industry self-regulation.

== Self-regulatory units ==
The self-regulatory system includes the following investigative, enforcement, and appellate units:

- BBB AUTO LINE: a dispute resolution program that offers both mediation and arbitration to resolve business-to-consumer automotive warranty, lemon law, class action, and dealer manufacturer disputes.
- National Advertising Division (NAD): provides independent self-regulation and dispute resolution services. NAD reviews national advertising in all media and its decisions set consistent standards for advertising truth and accuracy.
  - BBB National Programs is a member of the International Council for Advertising Self-Regulation (ICAS), a global organization that promotes effective self-regulation of advertising around the world. Mary K. Engle, who previously served as the Associate Director of the Division of Advertising Practices at the Federal Trade Commission (FTC), currently serves as the U.S. representative of ICAS.
- National Advertising Review Board (NARB): the appellate body for BBB National Programs’ advertising self-regulatory programs (NAD, CARU, and DSSRC). NARB's panel members include 87 volunteer professionals from the national advertising industry, agencies, and public members, such as academics and former members of the public sector.
- Children's Advertising Review Unit (CARU): a self-regulatory program and the nation's first Safe Harbor Program under the Children's Online Privacy Protection Act, that helps companies comply with laws and guidelines that protect children from deceptive or inappropriate advertising and ensure that, in an online environment, children's data is collected and handled responsibly.
  - On April 19, 2022, the team behind CARU expanded into the teen space, launching the Teenage Privacy Program roadmap, which urges companies to tell teens ages 13 to 17 what kind of personal information is collected or inferred about them and what privacy controls are available to them. It also calls on companies to consider measures such as defaulting to more privacy-protective settings for teens and putting guardrails around messaging or sharing content with teens.
- BBB EU Privacy Shield: an independent recourse mechanism (IRM) for the U.S. Department of Commerce Privacy Shield program. This independent, third-party dispute resolution program enables U.S. businesses to demonstrate that their trans-Atlantic data transfers are consistent with European data protection rules and is a recognized Independent Recourse Mechanism under Privacy Shield.
- Global Privacy Program: The Global Privacy Program manages both the BBB EU Privacy Shield program and APEC certification programs. In January 2021, BBB National Programs became the first U.S.-based nonprofit accountability agent in the APEC (Asia-Pacific Economic Cooperation) Cross Border Privacy Rules and Privacy Recognition for Processors systems. Through this program, the organization works one on one with companies of all sizes doing business in the 21 economies to demonstrate compliance with the CBPR and PRP program requirements.
- Children's Food and Beverage Advertising Initiative (CFBAI): a self-regulation pledge program created to improve the landscape of food advertising to children. CFBAI works with leading food, beverage, and quick service restaurant companies to set and implement Uniform Nutrition Standards, which specify the science-based nutritional criteria for foods and beverages that can be advertised to children under age 13.
- Children's Confection Advertising Initiative (CCAI): modeled after CFBAI, is a self-regulation program for small- and medium-sized confectionery companies created in partnership with the National Confectioners Association to help improve the landscape of food advertising to children. CCAI companies commit to not advertising confections to children under age 13. The most recent company to join was Hostess in April 2022.
- Direct Selling Self-Regulatory Council (DSSRC): provides independent, impartial monitoring, dispute resolution, and enforcement of false product claims and income representations made by direct selling companies and their salesforce members across digital platforms.
- Digital Advertising Accountability Program (DAAP): developed by the Digital Advertising Alliance (DAA) to enforce industry self-regulation principles for data privacy in online and mobile advertising, holding companies accountable to the DAA's Privacy Principles. DAAP provides guidance to companies looking to comply with industry principles and responds to complaints filed by consumers about online privacy.
- Coalition for Better Advertising Dispute Resolution Program: an independent dispute resolution program for participants of the Better Ads Experience Program. The program helps enforce the Better Ads Standards, which identify optimal online advertising formats to create a better experience for consumers.
- Dispute Resolution Program for Verizon Wireless Customers: supports Verizon Wireless customers who need arbitration services for a dispute with Verizon Wireless of $10,000 or less. Before a customer can request arbitration, they must provide Verizon Wireless with written notice at least 30 days before arbitration is requested.

Parties may appeal decisions reached by NAD and CARU to NARB, the appellate body. Decisions reached by the self-regulatory system's investigative and appellate units are publicly reported through a press release. In addition, the decisions reported by NAD and CARU also are compiled 10 times each year into the “NAD/CARU Case Reports.” As of 2010, more than 5,000 self-regulatory decisions are included in the NARC Online Archive. The case reports and archive are not public, however; access to the archive is $6900.00 a year, even though procedures state that final case decisions are public.

== National Advertising Division ==
The National Advertising Division (NAD), established in 1971, is charged with monitoring and evaluating truth and accuracy in national advertising. The NAD examines and evaluates a wide range of advertising claims, including puffery, consumer surveys, product testing and product demonstrations, taste tests, pricing claims and disclosures. Through its unique window on the marketplace, NAD identifies hot issues in advertising and promotion. NAD's decisions assist advertisers in anticipating and responding to the challenges that new products and new media can pose.

Since its inception, NAD has examined advertising claims for a wide range of products, including:

- Products promoted as "green" or environmentally beneficial
- Infant nutrition products
- Over-the-counter drugs and dietary supplements
- Consumer electronics
- Broadband technology
- Functional foods and beverages
- Cosmetics
- Building supplies and home repair and renovation products
- Energy services

In cooperation with the Council for Responsible Nutrition, NAD expanded its review of advertising for dietary supplements, a nearly $25 billion industry that is frequently criticized for misleading advertising. The program closed more than 360 cases concerning claims made in dietary supplement advertising. The program ended on July 1, 2020. The NAD opens hundreds of cases each year and more than 95 percent of the advertisers that appear before NAD voluntarily comply with NAD's decisions.

NAD cases often originate through a challenge filed by one advertiser against the advertising claims made by a competing advertiser. In addition, NAD monitors national advertising and investigates complaints filed by consumers and advocacy groups or referred by local Better Business Bureaus. The course of NAD review proceedings is detailed in The Advertising Industry's Process of Self-Regulation, Policies and Procedures by the National Advertising Review Council. The Procedures describe and explain the filing deadlines and requirements for submissions from challengers and advertisers. NAD examines advertising to determine whether the evidence provided by the advertiser fully supports the advertising claims at issue in an NAD review.

The NAD can be expected to make one of three determinations for every claim at issue.

- First, the NAD may find that the evidence provided by the advertiser fully supports or substantiates the claim under review.
- Second, the NAD may determine that the substantiation is not sufficient to support the advertising claims and recommend the claims be modified in current and future advertising to better reflect the evidence in the record.
- Third, the NAD may conclude that the evidence is wholly insufficient to support the claims. In that circumstance, the NAD will recommend that the advertising claims be discontinued.

Should an advertiser refuse to participate, NAD will to refer the advertiser to the appropriate regulatory agency. NAD's findings are detailed in the final decision and outlined in a press release. In addition, NAD regularly monitors closed cases to ensure that advertisers comply with NAD decisions. If the NAD determines the advertiser made a reasonable attempt to comply, but there are still concerns outstanding, the NAD will work with the advertiser to address those concerns. Should the NAD determine that no effort was made to comply, or that the advertisers is unwilling to make further modifications NAD deems necessary, the Procedures allow the NAD to refer the advertiser to the appropriate regulatory agency. NAD cases are closely watched by national advertisers and by the advertising industry.

== Children's Advertising Review Unit ==
The Children's Advertising Review Unit (CARU) was established in 1974 for the promotion of responsible advertising to children under the age of 13 in all media. CARU reviews and evaluates advertising for truth, accuracy, appropriateness and sensitivity to children's still developing cognitive abilities in accordance with its Self-Regulatory Program for Children's Advertising (the Guidelines), which hold advertisers to strict standards. CARU routinely monitors advertisements found in all media (broadcast and cable TV, radio, children's magazines, comic books, the Internet and mobile services, and more) for compliance with its Guidelines. When ads are found to be misleading, inaccurate or inconsistent with its Guidelines, CARU initiates an inquiry and examines the advertising to ensure compliance with the Guidelines. If an ad is found to be non-compliant, CARU seeks discontinuance or correction. The results of CARU inquiries are publicly recorded in the NAD/CARU Case Reports. CARU also handles advertiser challenges and consumer complaints. In 1996, CARU added a section to its Guidelines that highlight issues that are unique to the Internet including Websites directed at children under age 13 for online privacy. In January 2001, CARU's self-regulatory program became the first Federal Trade Commission-approved Safe Harbor under the federal Children's Online Privacy Protection Act of 1998 Children's Online Privacy Protection Act of 1998 (COPPA). Participants who adhere to CARU's Guidelines are deemed in compliance with COPPA and essentially insulated from FTC enforcement action as long as they comply with program requirements.

=== CARU’S Guidelines ===
CARU's Self-Regulatory Guidelines are based upon the following core principles:

1. Advertisers have special responsibilities when advertising to children or collecting data from children online. They should take into account the limited knowledge, experience, sophistication and maturity of the audience to which the message is directed. They should recognize that younger children have a limited capacity to evaluate the credibility of information, may not understand the persuasive intent of advertising, and may not even understand that they are being subject to advertising.
2. Advertising should be neither deceptive nor unfair, as these terms are applied under the Federal Trade Commission Act, to the children to whom it is directed.
3. Advertisers should have adequate substantiation for objective advertising claims, as those claims are reasonably interpreted by the children to whom they are directed.
4. Advertising should not stimulate children's unreasonable expectations about product quality or performance.
5. Products and content inappropriate for children should not be advertised directly to them.
6. Advertisers should avoid social stereotyping and appeals to prejudice, and are encouraged to incorporate minority and other groups in advertisements and to present positive role models whenever possible.
7. Advertisers are encouraged to capitalize on the potential of advertising to serve an educational role and influence positive personal qualities and behaviors in children, e.g., being honest and respectful of others, taking safety precautions, and engaging in physical activity.
8. Although there are many influences that affect a child's personal and social development, it remains the prime responsibility of the parents to provide guidance for children. Advertisers should contribute to this parent-child relationship in a constructive manner.

In July 2021, CARU issued revised guidelines for responsible advertising to children which went into effect January 1, 2022. The core principles of the CARU Advertising Guidelines remained the same, but the revised Guidelines:

1. Move beyond television-centric to address and reflect today’s digital advertising environment.
2. Contain a new section dedicated to in-app and in-game advertising and purchases.
3. Contain a new guideline requiring that advertising not portray or encourage negative social stereotyping, prejudice, or discrimination.
4. Incorporate updated FTC guidance on endorsements and influencer marketing.
5. Apply to children under age 13 across all child-directed content no matter the platform. The previous Guidelines applied primarily to children under age 12.
6. More clearly spell out the factors that determine when an ad is primarily directed to children under age 13.
7. Remove the children’s privacy guidelines, included in the CARU Advertising Guidelines since 1996, to a separate document, the CARU Self-Regulatory Guidelines for Children’s Online Privacy Protection.

On August 23, 2022, CARU issued a Compliance Warning Regarding Advertising Practices Directed to Children in the Metaverse.

== National Advertising Review Board ==
NARB is the appeals board for the National Advertising Division (NAD), Children's Advertising Review Unit (CARU), and the Direct Selling Self Regulatory Council (DSSRC). When an advertiser or challenger disagrees with an NAD, DSSRC, or CARU recommendation, they may appeal the decision to the NARB for additional review.

In 2023, BBB National Programs announced the 91 panel pool members of the 2023 National Advertising Review Board. Members are nominated from three different categories:

- National Advertisers
- Advertising Agencies
- Public Members (academics and other members of the public sector)

NARB members are nominated for their stature and experience in their respective fields. If an NAD, DSSRC, or CARU decision is appealed, a five-member NARB panel is chosen to review the decisions. All NARB decisions are published.

== Leadership ==
BBB National Programs, Inc. (BBB NP) announced the appointment of Eric D. Reicin as President and Chief Executive Officer on November 4, 2019. His appointment follows a June 1, 2019 reorganization resulting in the establishment of BBB NP.

The BBB National Programs Board of Directors support and inform the development of new systems of independent industry self-regulation, helping industries moderate conduct to improve marketplace behavior for the ultimate benefit of consumers.

== History ==
In the late 1960s and early 1970s, a new consumer-protection movement had found its voice and legislators and regulators were listening. In his academic monograph, “The National Advertising Review Board, 1971-1976,” detailed the troubled commercial climate of the times: “Public opinion surveys of attitudes toward consumerism, business and advertising in the 1960s showed that early in the decade, the majority of studies reflected either positive or mixed attitudes toward advertising. In contrast, studies later in the 1960s and early 1970s reflected more negative attitudes toward advertising and a growing interest in consumerism. “During the same period, Congress passed a host of consumer-minded bills, including ‘truth-in-packaging’ legislation, the National Traffic and Motor Vehicle Safety Act and the Public Health Cigarette Smoking Act that banned cigarette advertising from the broadcast media. “The executive branch of government was active as well. Presidents Kennedy, Johnson and Nixon all sent consumer messages to Congress. The position of special assistant to the President for Consumer Affairs, the Office of Consumer Affairs, the Consumer Advisory Council and the Committee on Consumer Interests were all established in that period.” Noted Zanot, “the sheer amount of consumer protection activity at the federal level during the 1960s and 1970s far surpassed that of any other period in U.S. history.” Leaders within the advertising industry were urging the development of a self-regulatory mechanism that could help calm what Zanot described as “a gathering storm of consumerism.”

NARC was established in 1971 by the American Advertising Federation (AAF), the American Association of Advertising Agencies (AAAA), the Association of National Advertisers (ANA) and the Council of Better Business Bureaus (CBBB). In 2009, the NARC Board of Directors was expanded to include the chief executive officers of the Direct Marketing Association (DMA), Electronic Retailing Association (ERA), and Interactive Advertising Bureau (IAB). The 11-member Board set policies and procedures for advertising industry self-regulation. The CBBB provided third-party oversight of the self-regulatory system.

In his monograph, Zanot reported that Howard Bell, then-president of the AAF American Advertising Federation and current chairman of the NARB, “became a catalyst in the development of new self-regulatory measures.” Zanot also excerpted a speech delivered in September 1970 by the late Victor Elting, Jr., then-chairman of the AAF, at a meeting of the Chicago Advertising Club. “There are ticking sounds that we hear in all the pressure groups, congressional hearings and other forums that are meeting to decide our fate. Let's defuse them by having the strength and courage to determine our fate for ourselves,” Elting said. Eight months later, on May 13, 1971, Elting announced that the AAF, 4A's, ANA, and CBBB has formed the NARC. NARC was charged with setting policies for the NAD and NARB.

By 1972, the NAD had received or initiated 444 complaints and was struggling against a continuing tide of criticism. By 1973, though, that criticism had begun to abate. As Zanot reported, the organization received an “unexpected boost” when FTC Commissioner Mary Gardiner Jones, a consumer advocate, declared the system to be “a self-regulatory effort of truly historic proportions.”

In 2012, the National Advertising Review Council (NARC), rebranded as the Advertising Self-Regulatory Council (ASRC). The new name and new brand were designed to offer an explicit statement about the mission and purpose of the organization—to advance the self-regulation of the advertising industry. In 2019, ASRC folded into BBB National Programs, a new independent non-profit organization established as a result of the restructuring of the Council of Better Business Bureaus. The self-regulatory programs defined on this page including NAD, NARB, CARU, DSSRC, AUTO LINE, and others are divisions of BBB National Programs.

The International Association of Better Business Bureaus (IABBB) and BBB National Programs are two separate organizations. While both organizations are focused on promoting trust and ethical business practices, they operate independently of each other and have different areas of focus.

The Advertising Self-Regulatory Council (ASRC) was the American advertising industry's self-regulatory body until June 2019. As of June 2019, BBB National Programs' National Advertising Division (NAD) is the U.S. advertising industry's self-regulatory body.

On June 15, 2021 BBB National Programs was the recipient of the Best Sectoral Initiative award for the DIrect Selling Self-Regualtory Council, an initiative developed to promote truth and transparency in the direct selling industry including effective proactive monitoring of the marketplace.

In 2022, BBB National Programs was referenced in OECD's report Dark Commercial Patterns.

Prior to ASRC, the organization's name was National Advertising Review Council (NARC). The organization changed its name in 2012.
