= School bus advertising =

School Bus

School bus advertising is a form of advertising in the United States in which advertising space is sold on the sides of school buses. School districts typically partner with a marketing firm to sell the space and market the program to businesses, Depending on the size and market of each individual school district, this form of advertising can be very lucrative. Scottsdale Union School District in Arizona expected to make $900,000 in three years, while a smaller school district of 4,100 students in Michigan anticipated $70,000 a year.

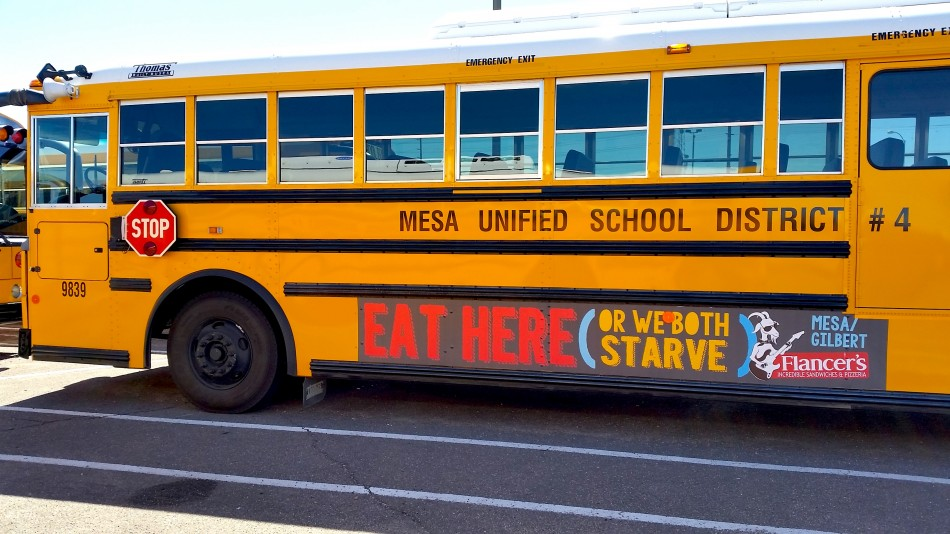
Advertising on a school bus in Arizona

As of 2024, the U.S. states that allow exterior school bus advertising are: Arizona, Colorado, Georgia, Massachusetts, Minnesota, Nevada, New Jersey, Texas, and Utah. New Mexico, Rhode Island, and Tennessee allow both interior and exterior advertisements.

In most U.S. states, law prohibits advertisements for alcohol, tobacco, religious organizations, as well as political ads or anything sexually explicit in nature. Most school districts have final approval of the ads. Each state has its own regulations regarding size, location and material of the ads. Texas, for instance, allows advertisements in three areas on the bus: 30" by 90" located on the left rear quarter panel below the windows, and 18" by 108" located on either side above the windows. Tennessee allows a 16" by 60" ad on both sides of the bus below the windows.
