= Kid Food =

Book by Bettina Elias Siegel

- Author: Bettina Elias Siegel
- Language: English
- Published: 2019
- Publication place: United States

Kid Food by Bettina Elias Siegel is a 2019 book about the shift in children's eating habits and fast food culture. The book offers parenting advice for raising children to eat a healthy diet in a food environment dominated by processed foods.

== Background ==
Kid Food was Siegel's first published book. It was influenced by her experiences as an advocate for improving the nutritional quality of American school lunch meals and running her blog The Lunch Tray. For the book, Siegel researched the history of children being served different food from adults and how it was advertised to consumers.

== See also ==
- Childhood obesity
- Criticism of fast food
- National School Lunch Act
- Let's Move!
