= Aiba =

Aiba (相羽 or 相葉) may refer to:

- Aiba (company), established in 1689; see list of oldest companies
- Miyuki Aiba or Takayama Aiba, characters of the 1992 anime television series Tekkaman Blade

== People ==
- Aina Aiba (相羽 あいな, born 1988), Japanese singer and voice actress
- Hiroki Aiba (相葉 裕樹, born 1987), Japanese actor, dancer and singer
- Masaki Aiba (相葉 雅紀, born 1982), Japanese entertainment executive
- Garri Aiba (გარი აიბა, died 2004), Abkhazian revolutionary

== See also ==
- AIBA (disambiguation)
