= Chain store =

Retail outlets that share a brand and central management

A chain store or retail chain is a retail outlet in which several locations share a brand, central management, and standardized business practices. They have come to dominate many retail markets, dining markets, and service categories in many parts of the world. A franchised retail establishment is one form of a chain store. In 2005, the world's largest retail chain, Walmart, became the world's largest corporation based on gross sales.

== History ==
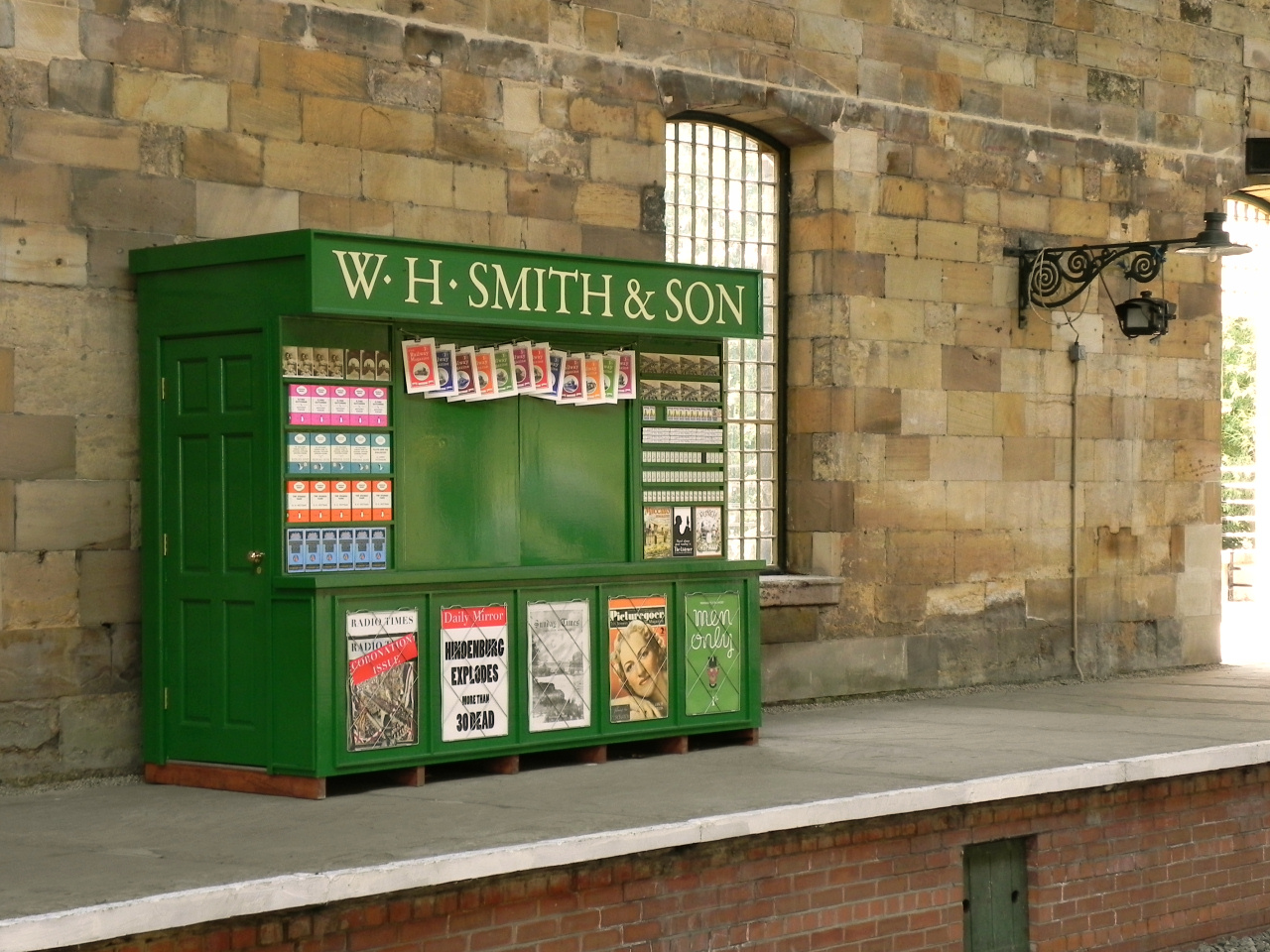
Heritage W.H. Smith stall at Pickering railway station in North Yorkshire

In 1792, Henry Walton Smith and his wife Anna established W.H. Smith as a news vending business in London that would become a national concern in the mid-19th century under the management of their grandson William Henry Smith. The world's oldest national retail chain, the firm took advantage of the railway boom during the Industrial Revolution by opening newsstands at railway stations beginning in 1848. The firm, now called WHSmith, had more than 1,400 locations as of 2017.

In the U.S., chain stores likely began with J. Stiner & Company, which operated several tea shops in New York City around 1860. By 1900, George Huntington Hartford had built the Great Atlantic & Pacific Tea Company, originally a tea distributor based in New York City, into a grocery chain that operated almost 200 stores. Dozens of other grocery, drug, tobacco, and variety stores opened additional locations around the same time, so retail chains were common in the United States by 1910. Several state legislatures considered measures to restrict the growth of chains, and in 1914, concern about chain stores contributed to passage of the Federal Trade Commission Act and the Clayton Antitrust Act.

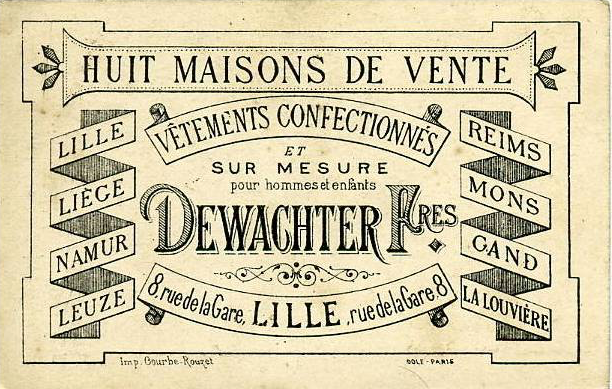
Postcard advertisement listing eight cities and towns where Dewachter Frères offered "ready-to-wear clothes and by measure for men and children," c. 1885

Isidore, Benjamin and Modeste Dewachter originated the idea of the chain department store in Belgium in 1868, 10 years before A&P began offering more than coffee and tea. They started with four locations for Maisons Dewachter (Houses of Dewachter): La Louvière, Mons, Namur, and Leuze. They later incorporated as Dewachter frères (Dewachter Brothers) on January 1, 1875. The brothers offered ready-to-wear clothing for men and children and specialty clothing such as riding apparel and beachwear. Isidore owned 51% of the company, while his brothers split the remaining 49%. Under Isidore's (and later his son Louis') leadership, Maisons Dewachter became one of the most recognized names in Belgium and France, with stores in 20 cities and towns. Some cities had multiple stores, such as Bordeaux, France. Louis Dewachter also became an internationally known landscape artist, painting under the pseudonym Louis Dewis.

By the early 1920s, chain retailing was well established in the United States, with A&P, Woolworth's, American Stores, and United Cigar Stores being the largest. By the 1930s, chain stores had come of age, and stopped increasing their total market share. Court decisions against the chains' price-cutting appeared as early as 1906, and laws against chain stores began in the 1920s, along with legal countermeasures by chain-store groups. State taxes on chain stores were upheld by the U.S. Supreme Court in 1931. Between then and 1933, 525 chain-store tax bills were introduced in state legislatures, and by the end of 1933, special taxes on retail chains were in force in 17 states.

== Characteristics ==
A chain store is characterised by the ownership or franchise relationship between the local business or outlet and a controlling business.

=== Difference between a "chain" and formula retail ===
While chains are typically "formula retail", a chain refers to ownership or franchise, whereas "formula retail" or "formula business" refers to the characteristics of the business. Considerable overlap occurs because key characteristic of a formula retail business is that it is controlled as a part of a business relationship, and is generally part of a chain. Nevertheless, most codified municipal regulation relies on definitions of formula retail (e.g., formula restaurants), in part because a restriction directed to "chains" may be deemed an impermissible restriction on interstate commerce (in the US), or as exceeding municipal zoning authority (i.e., regulating "who owns it" rather than the characteristics of the business). Noncodified restrictions sometimes target "chains". A municipal ordinance may seek to prohibit "formula businesses" to maintain the character of a community and support local businesses that serve the surrounding neighborhood.

=== Decline ===
Brick-and-mortar chain stores have been declining, as retail has shifted to online shopping, leading to historically high retail vacancy rates. The 100-year-old Radio Shack chain went from 7,400 stores in 2001 to 400 stores in 2018. FYE, the last remaining music chain store in the United States, has shrunk from over 1,000 at its height to 270 locations in 2018. In 2019, Payless ShoeSource stated that it would be closing all remaining 2,100 stores in the US.

== Restaurant chains ==
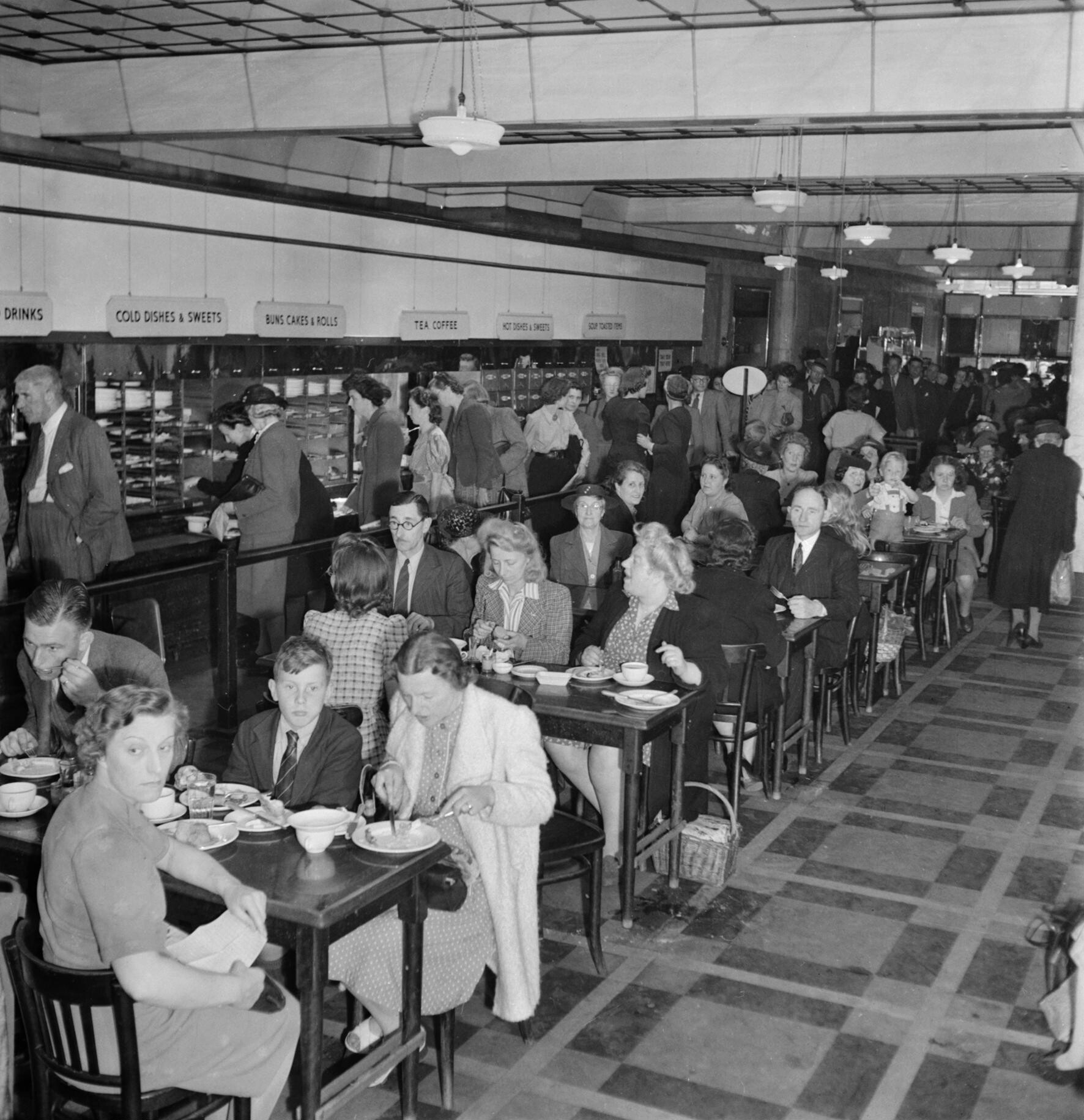
Opening the first of its chain of teashops in 1894, branch of Lyons in Reading, Berkshire, pictured in 1945

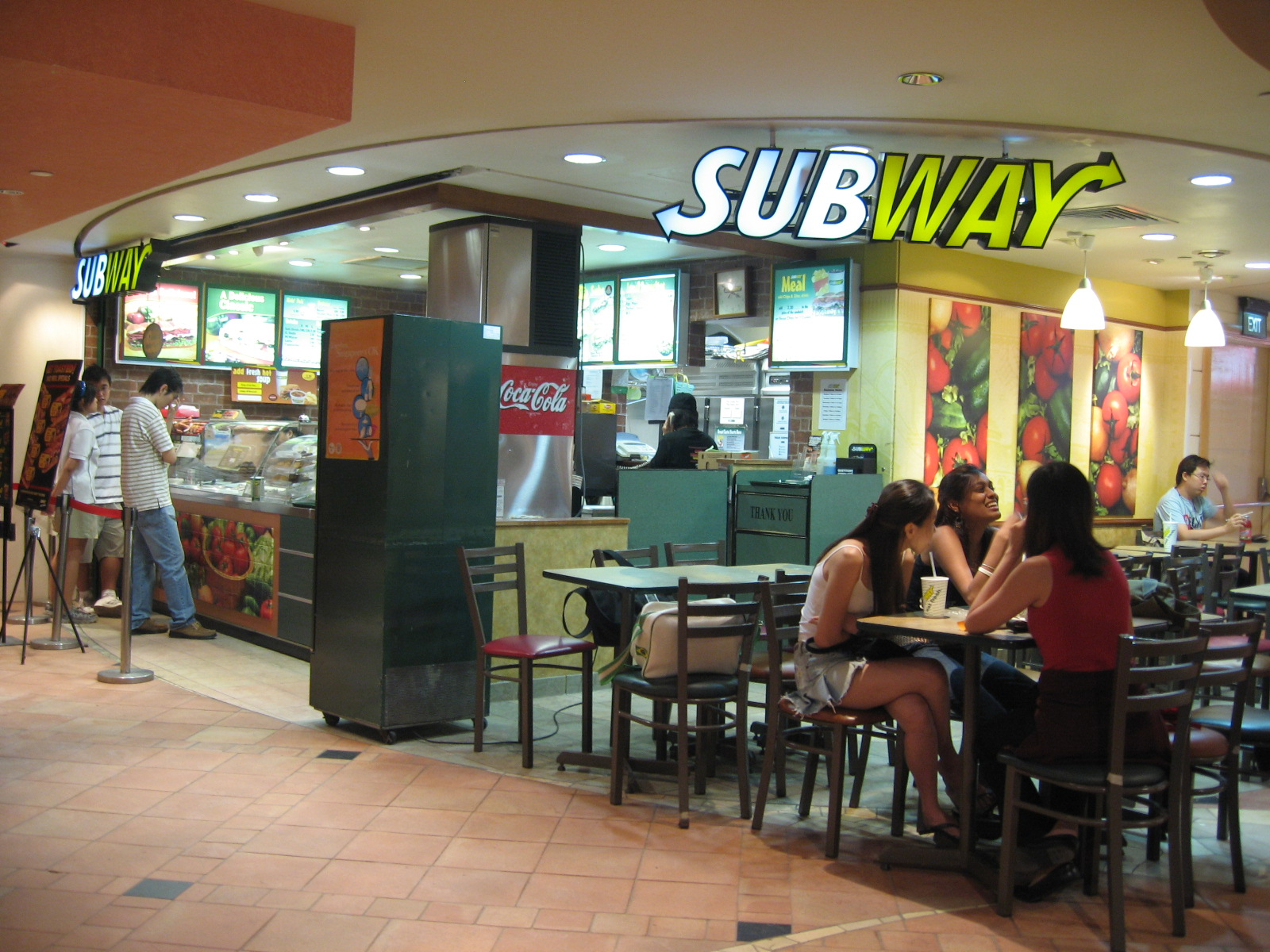
A Subway franchise restaurant in Singapore, 2006

A restaurant chain is a set of related restaurants in many different locations that are either under shared corporate ownership or franchising agreements. Typically, the restaurants within a chain are built to a standard format through architectural prototype development and offer a standard menu and/or services. Fast-food restaurants are the most common, but sit-down restaurant chains also exist. Restaurant chains locations are often found near highways, shopping malls, and densely populated urban or tourist areas.

=== Britain ===
In 1896, Samuel Isaacs from Whitechapel, East London, opened the first fish and chips restaurant (as opposed to a take-away) in London, and its instant popularity led to a chain comprising 22 restaurants with locations around London and seaside resorts in southern England, including Brighton, Ramsgate, and Margate. In 1864, the Aerated Bread Company (ABC) began operating a chain of teashops in Britain. ABC was overtaken as the leader in the field by Lyons, co-founded by Joseph Lyons in 1884. From 1909, Lyons began operating a chain of teashops that became a staple of the High Street in the UK, and at its peak, the firm numbered around 200 cafes.

== Opposition ==
The displacement of independent businesses by chains has sparked increased collaboration among independent businesses and communities to prevent chain proliferation. These efforts include community-based organizing through independent business alliances (in the U.S. and Canada) and "buy local" campaigns. In the U.S., trade organizations such as the American Booksellers Association and American Specialty Toy Retailers do national promotion and advocacy. Nongovernmental organizations, such as the New Economics Foundation provide research and tools for pro-independent business education and policy while the American Independent Business Alliance, provide direct assistance for community-level organizing.

== Regulation and exclusion ==
A variety of towns and cities in the United States whose residents wish to retain their distinctive character—such as San Francisco; Provincetown, Massachusetts and other Cape Cod villages; Bristol, Rhode Island; McCall, Idaho; Port Townsend, Washington; Ogunquit, Maine; Windermere, Florida; and Carmel-by-the-Sea, California—closely regulate or even exclude chain stores. They do not exclude the chain itself, only the standardized formula the chain uses, described as "formula businesses". For example, a restaurant owned by McDonald's often sells hamburgers, but does not use the formula franchise operation with the golden arches and standardized menu, uniforms, and procedures. The supposed reason these towns regulate chain stores is aesthetics and tourism. Proponents of formula restaurants and formula retail allege the restrictions are used to protect independent businesses from competition.

== See also ==
- Formula restaurant
- List of bookstore chains
- List of Canadian clothing store chains
- List of clothing and footwear shops in the United Kingdom
- List of restaurant chains
- List of supermarket chains
