= Keep Austin Weird =

Unofficial slogan of Austin, Texas

Keep Austin Weird is an unofficial slogan of Austin, Texas, United States, coined by Red Wassenich in 2000 while giving a pledge to "The Lounge Show", an eclectic program on KOOP Radio. The original intent of the slogan was to highlight the "unserious" and "unmaterialistic" nature of Austin, which he saw as distinguishing features from other cities. He began printing bumper stickers in July 2000 and operated the website keepaustinweird.com until his death in 2020 and published Keep Austin Weird: A Guide to the Odd Side of Town.

The slogan was later adopted by the Austin Independent Business Alliance to promote local small businesses. About two years after the phrase originated, Waterloo Records and BookPeople paired 'Keep Austin Weird' with 'Support Local Business' while opposing a proposed Borders Books and Music store near Sixth Street and Lamar.

Despite a challenge from Wassenich, the slogan was later trademarked by Outhouse Designs and used to market T-shirts, hats, and mugs. Other cities have since mimicked the nickname, including Portland in 2003, Louisville in 2005, and Indianapolis in 2013.

A 2010 book on the topic, Weird City: Sense of Place and Creative Resistance in Austin, Texas, discusses the cultural evolution of the "Keep Austin Weird" movement as well as its commercialization and socio-political significance. The origins of Austin's unique culture have been claimed to be the product of unusually cheap housing prices following the end of a housing boom in the 1980s, combined with the location of the University of Texas at Austin in the city.

== Gallery ==
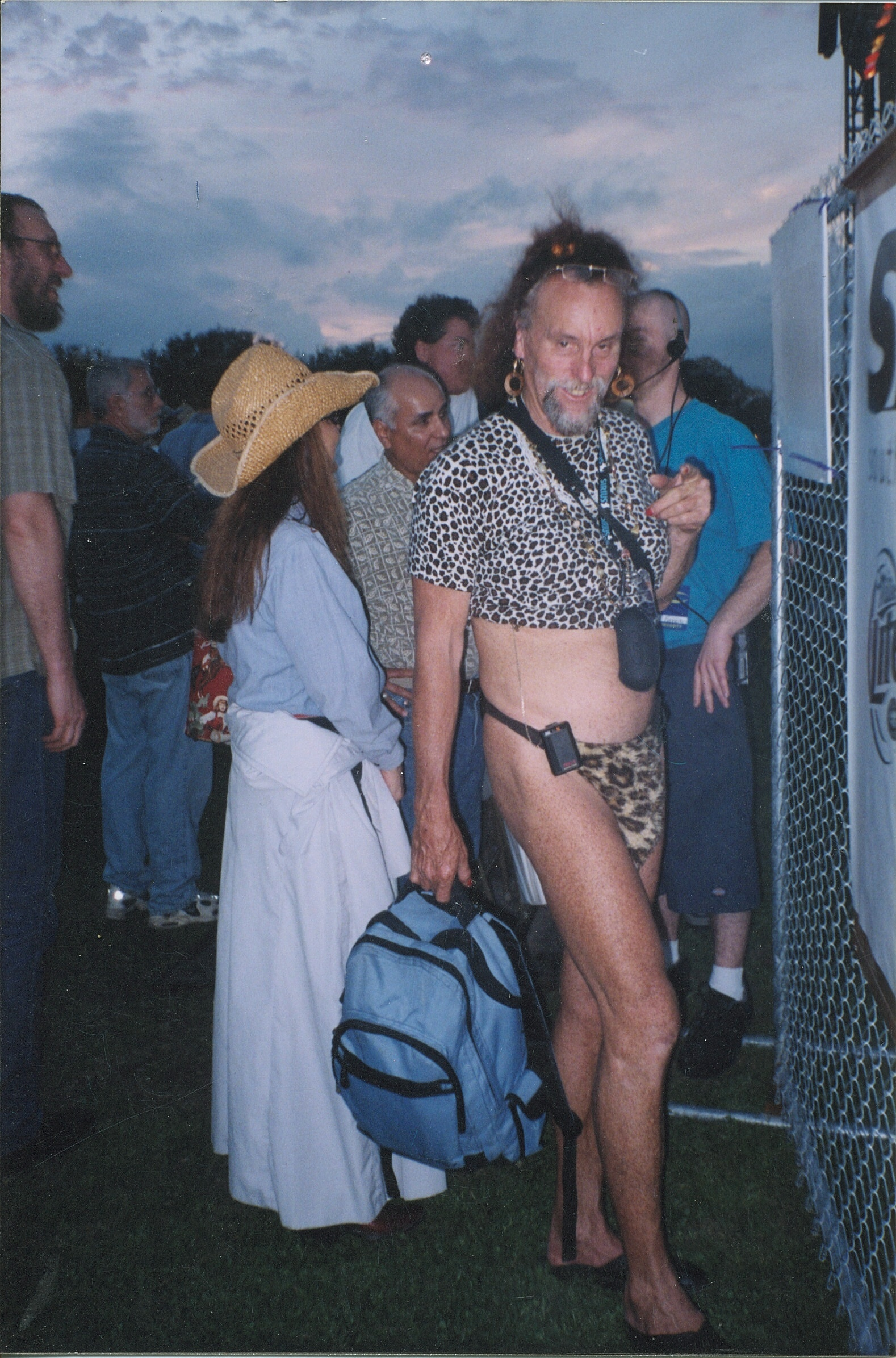
Iconic Austin local Leslie Cochran

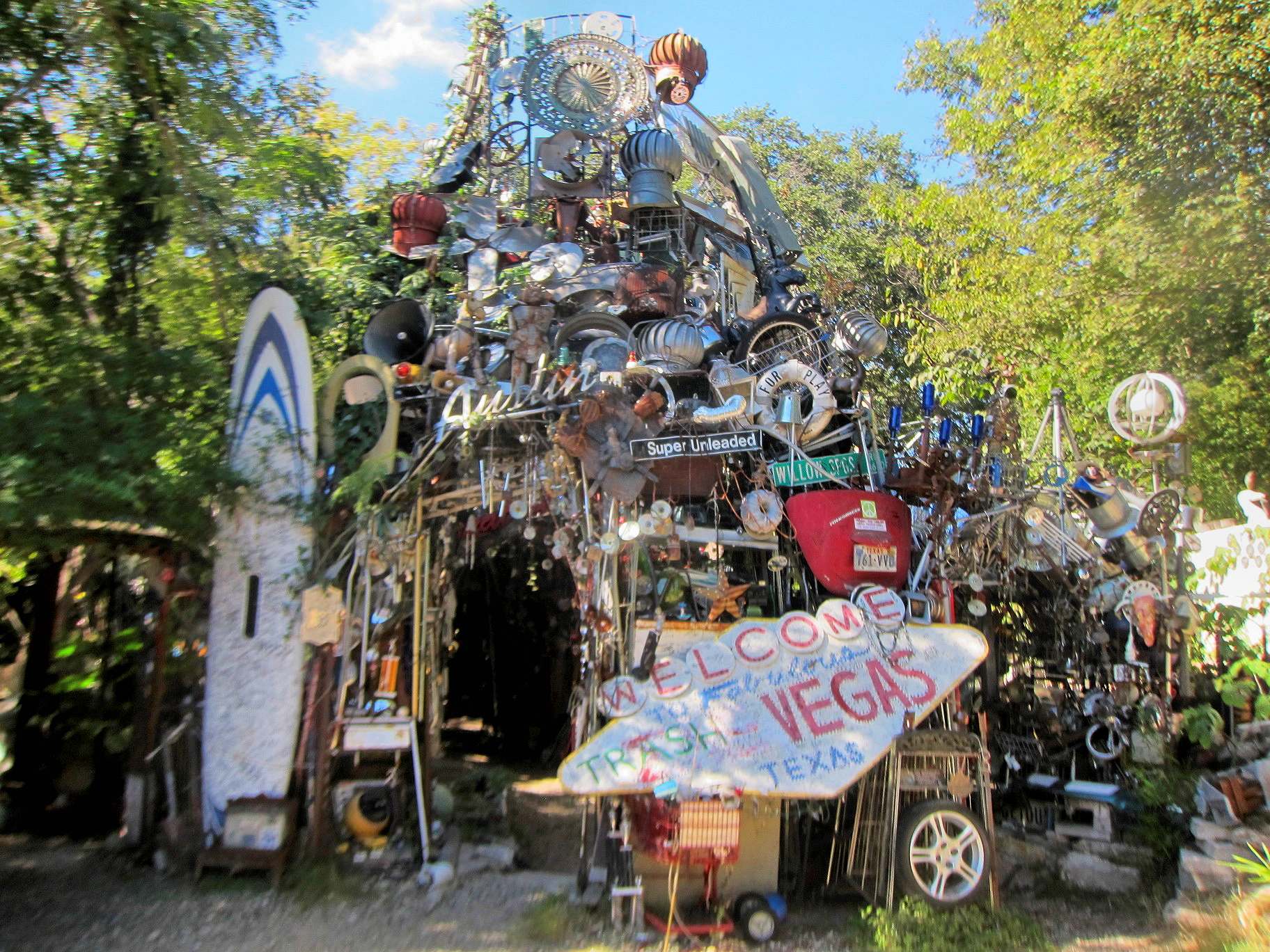
Cathedral of Junk

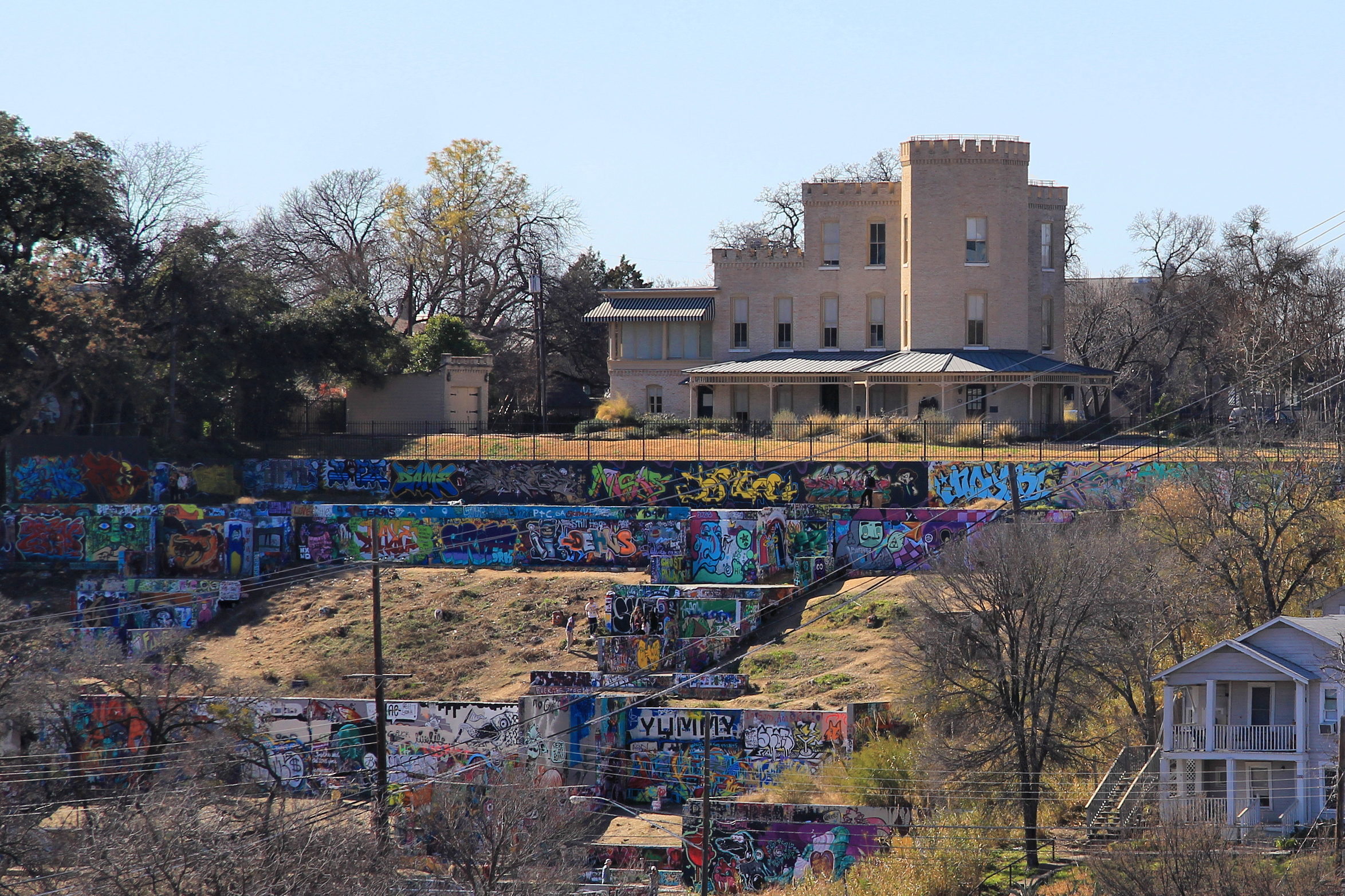
HOPE Outdoor Gallery

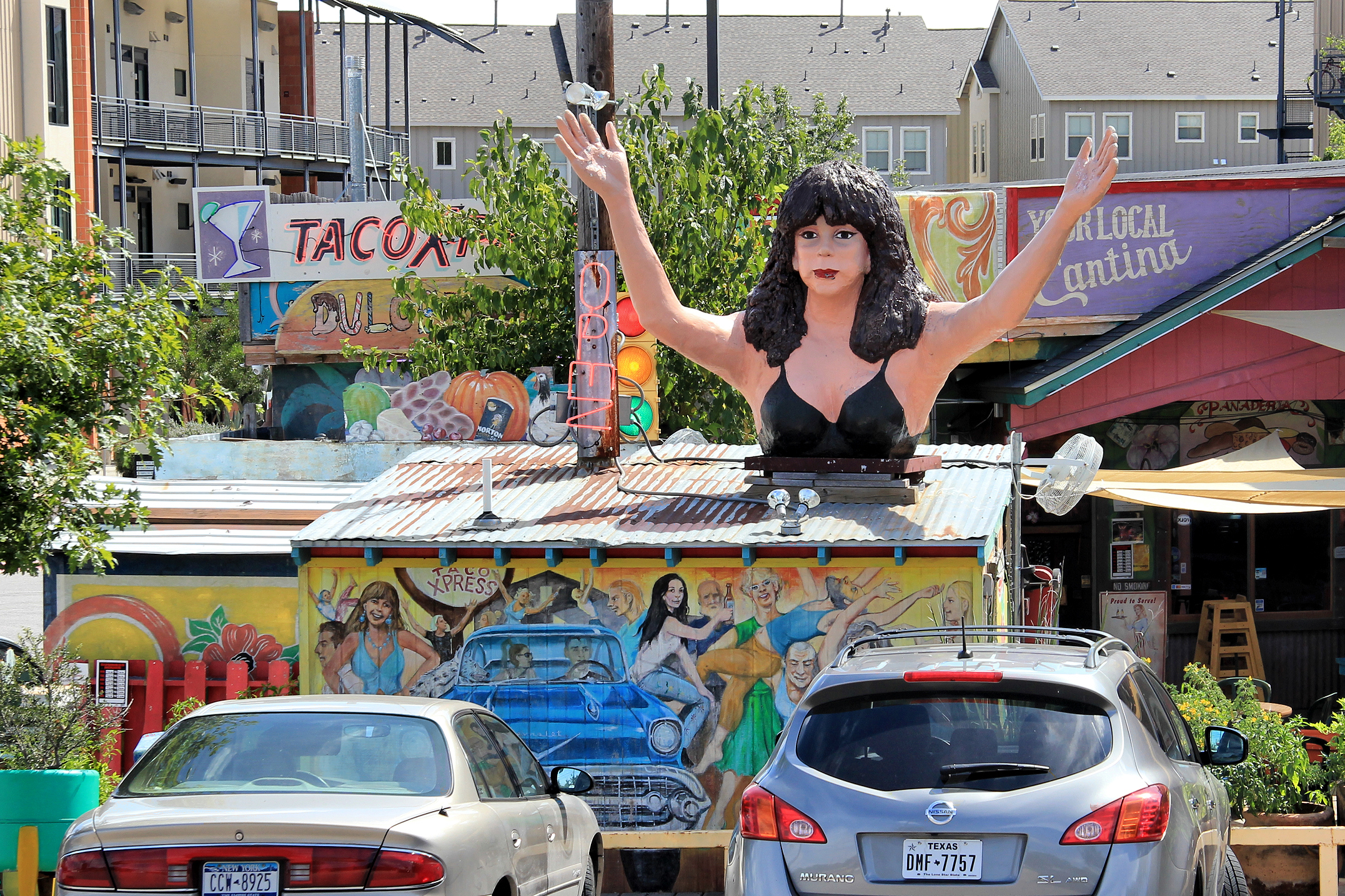
Maria's Taco Xpress restaurant

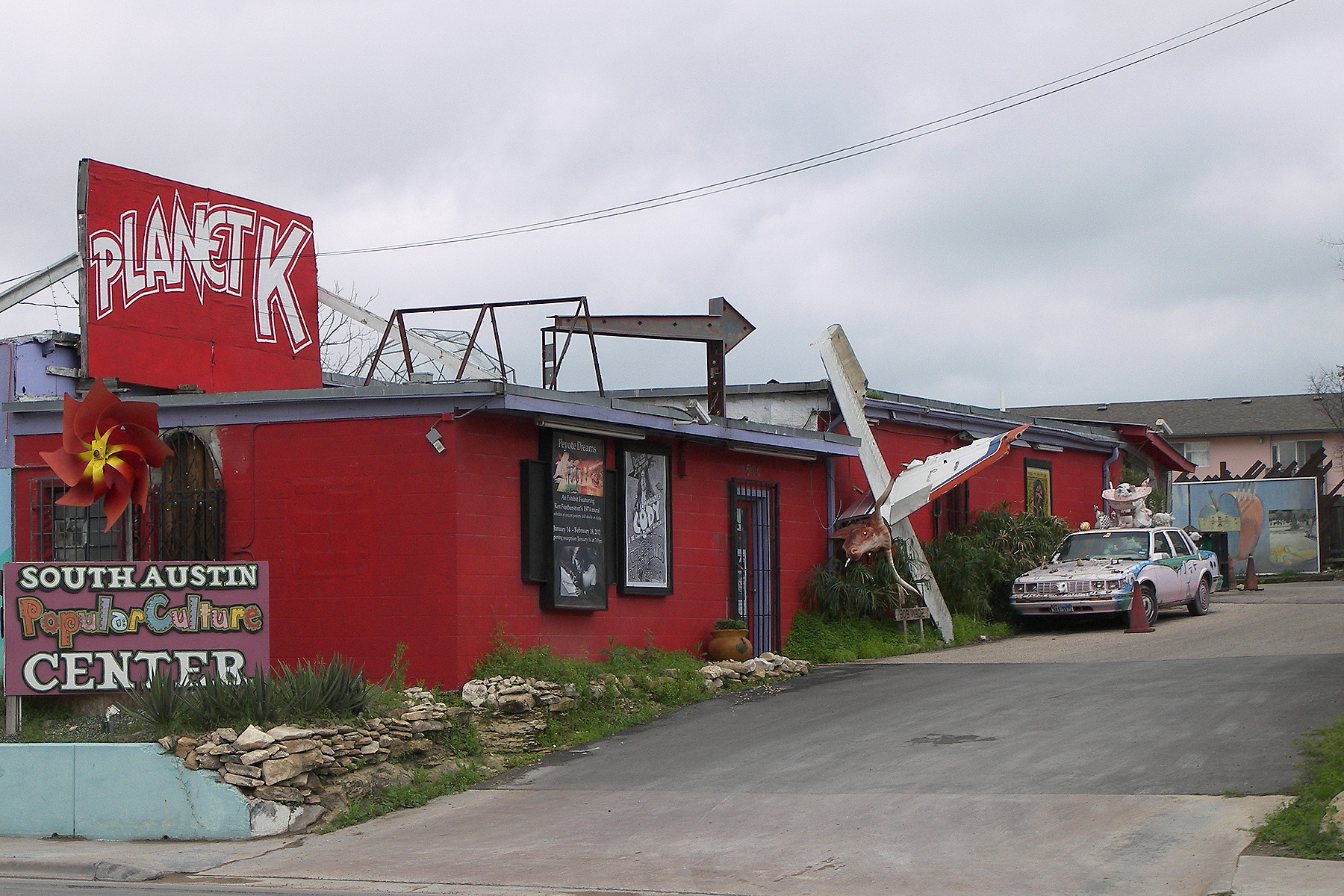
South Austin Museum of Popular Culture

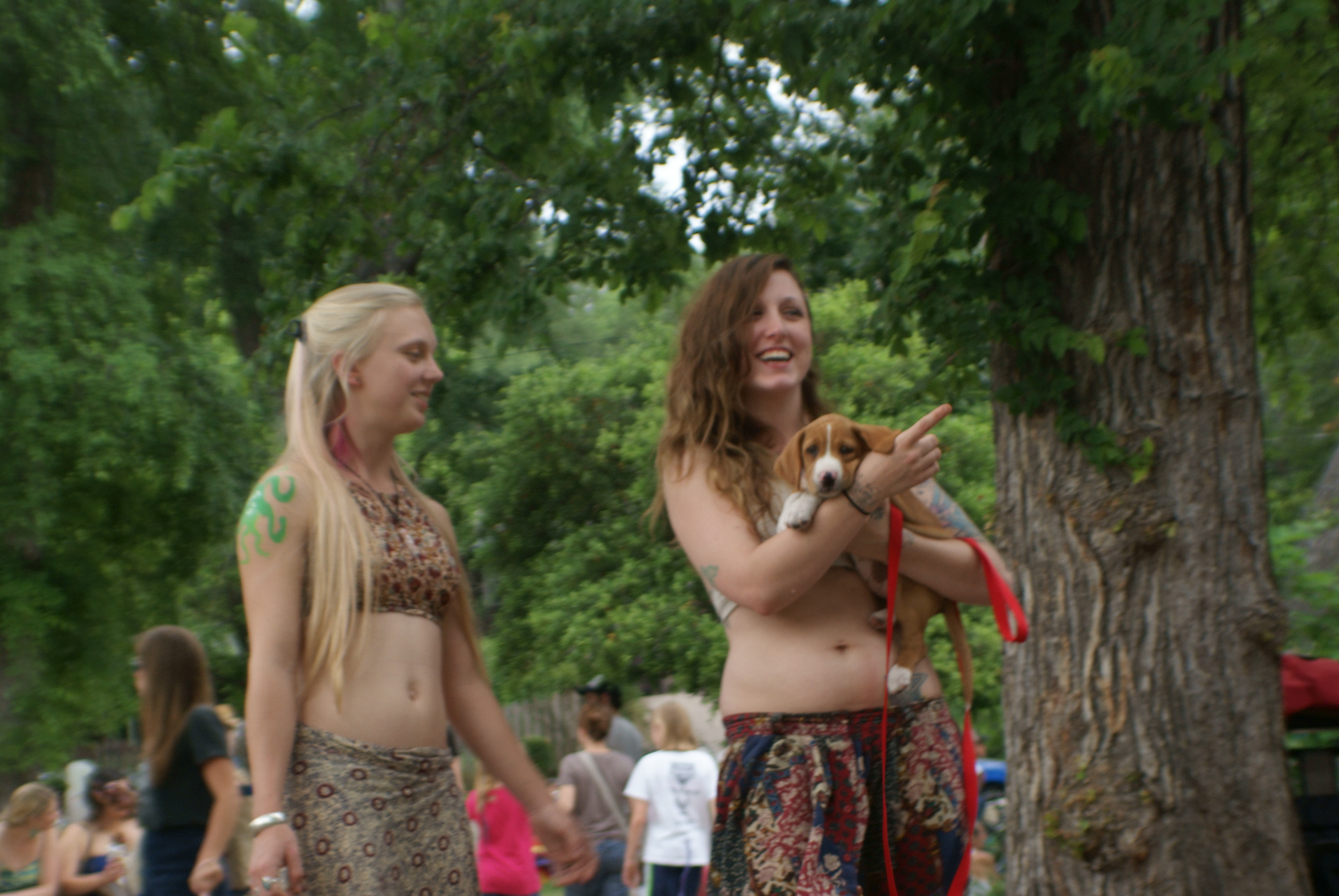
Eeyore's Birthday Party

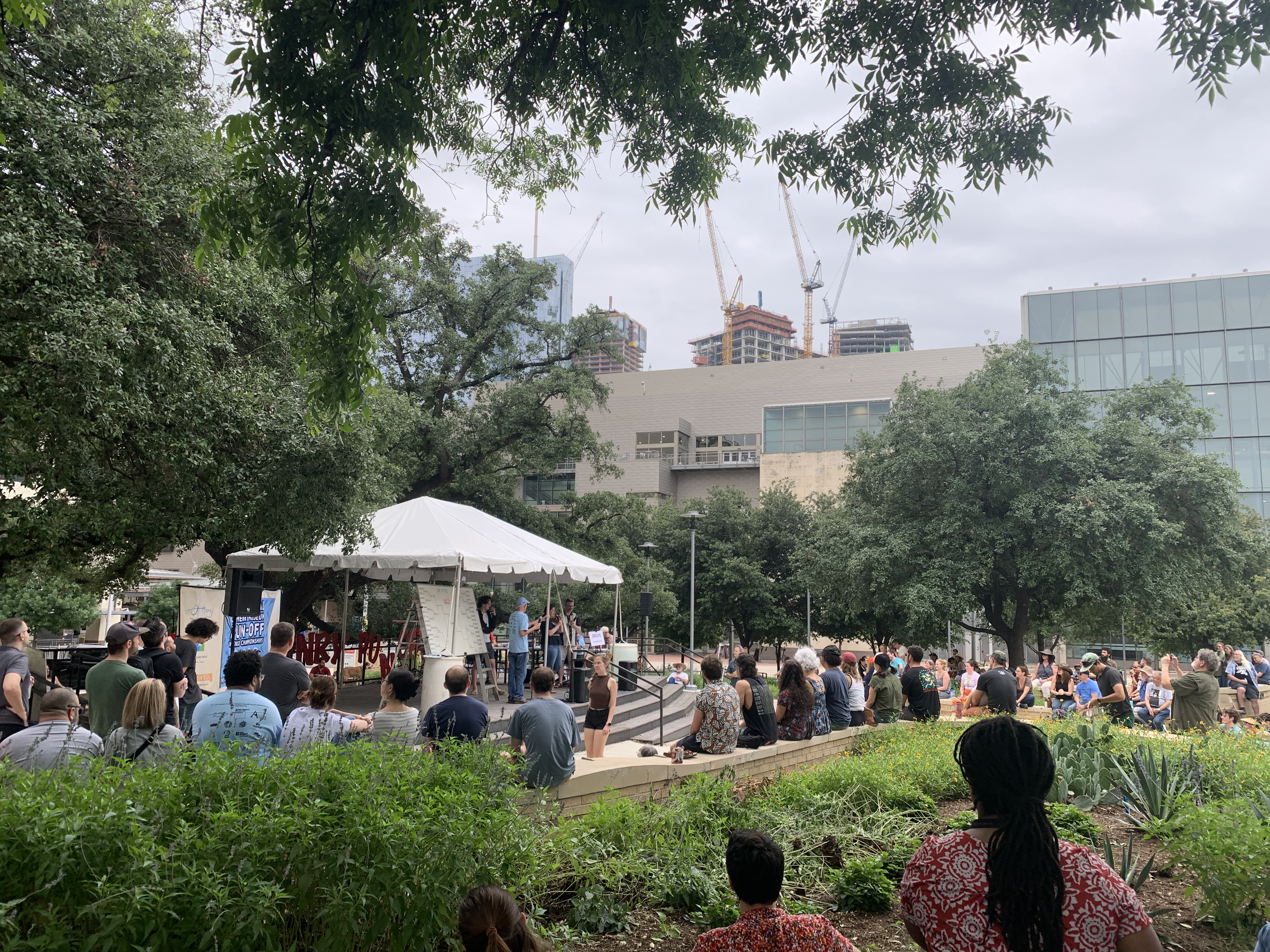
O. Henry Pun-Off

== See also ==
- Keep Portland Weird
- Keep Louisville Weird
