= Keep Louisville Weird =

Local business slogan in Louisville

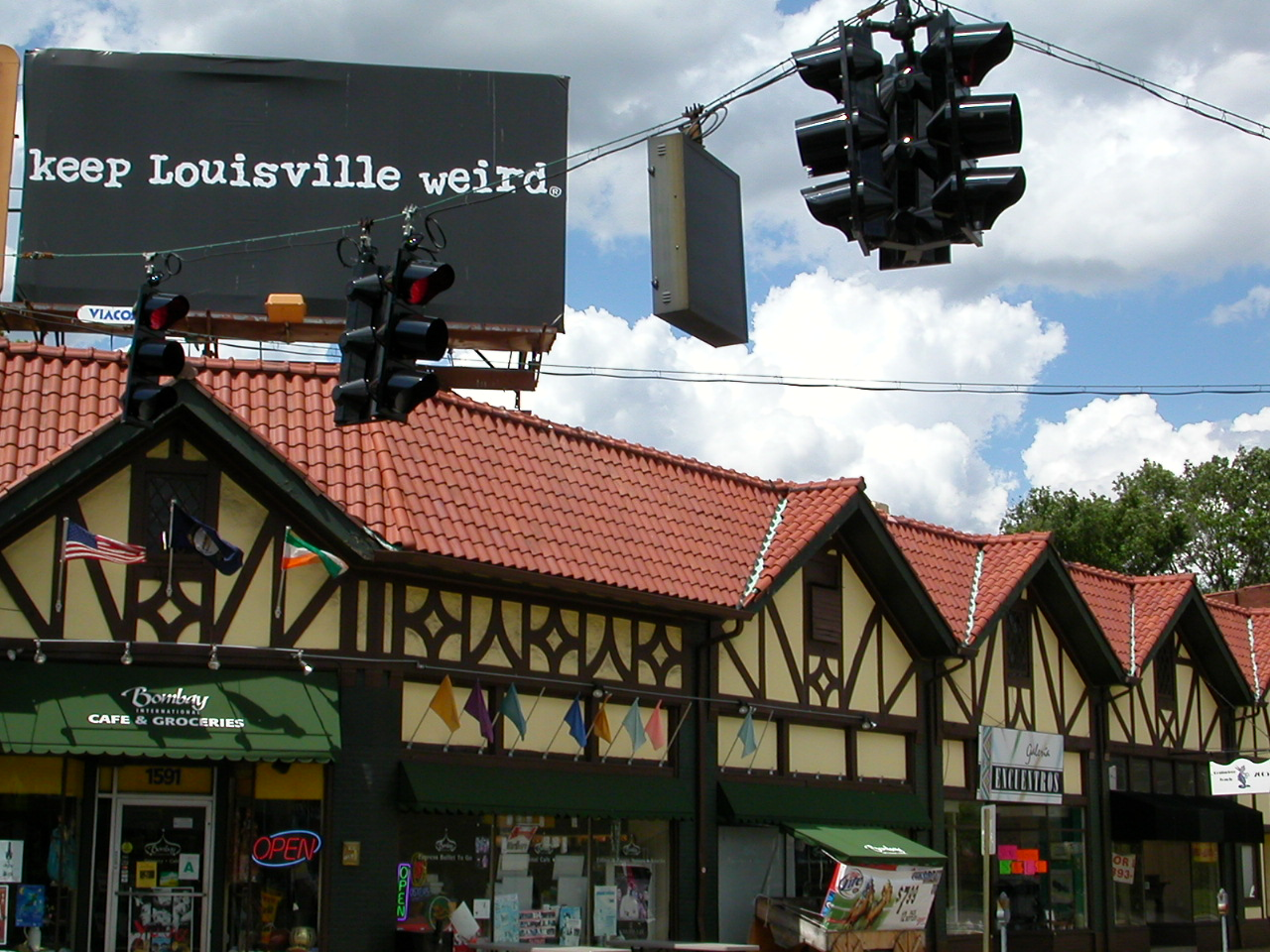
A "Keep Louisville Weird" billboard in East Louisville's Highlands district, specifically, the Bonnycastle neighborhood

"Keep Louisville Weird" is a popular slogan adopted by the Louisville Independent Business Alliance (LIBA) that appears on bumper stickers as well as numerous signs and public buildings throughout Louisville, Kentucky and its surrounding metro area, especially in The Highlands district. A variation of the slogan, "Keep Highland Weird", is also used in the Highlands district. It originated from the "Keep Austin Weird" slogan and is intended to promote local businesses, though it has evolved into an all-encompassing slogan that secondarily promotes individuality, expressionism, local art, as well as atypical lifestyle choices and leisure activities. The slogan frequently inspires articles and debate that attempt to quantify the exact level to which Louisville is considered weird, unusual or eccentric.

The Louisville Independent Business Alliance is among at least 85 community organizations affiliated with the American Independent Business Alliance, a national non-profit that supports and connects pro-local community-based organizations.

== History ==
The slogan was created by the Louisville Independent Business Alliance with the intention of supporting local businesses and small business owners. It was based on the Keep Austin Weird organization and slogan in Austin, Texas, and the Keep Portland Weird slogan used in Portland, Oregon, and was brought to Louisville shortly after around 2005.

== See also ==
- Keep Portland Weird
