= Criticism of fast food =

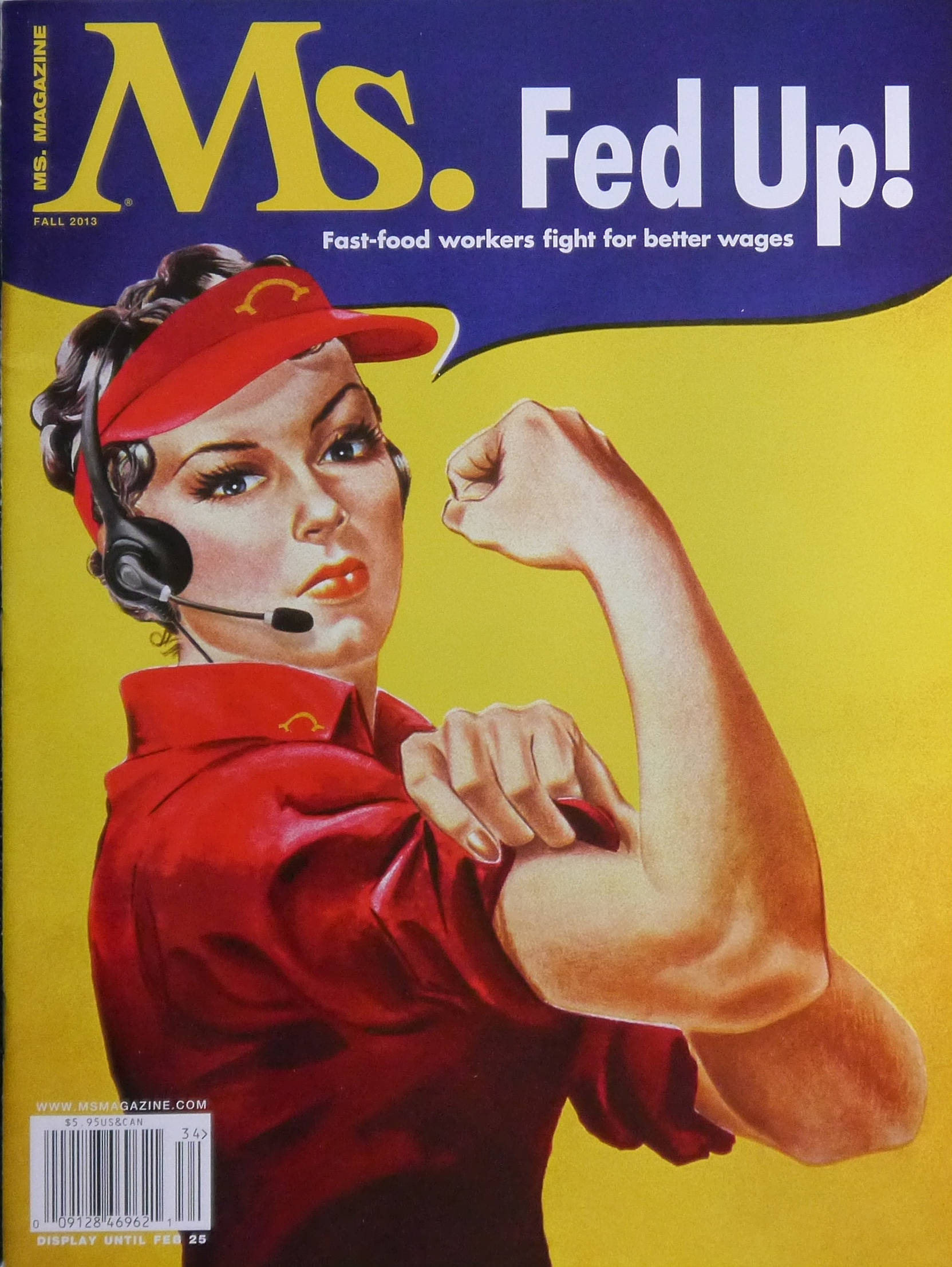
The fall 2013 issue of Ms. promotes the need for higher fast food worker wages.

Fast food has been criticized for negative health effects, animal cruelty, cases of worker exploitation, children-targeted marketing and claims of cultural degradation via shifts in people's eating patterns away from traditional foods. Fast food chains have come under fire from consumer groups, such as the Center for Science in the Public Interest, a longtime fast food critic over issues such as caloric content, trans fats and portion sizes. Social scientists have highlighted how the prominence of fast food narratives in popular urban legends suggests that modern consumers have an ambivalent relationship (characterized by guilt) with fast food, particularly in relation to children.

Some of these concerns have helped give rise to the slow food and local food movements. These movements seek to promote local cuisines and ingredients, and directly oppose laws and habits that encourage fast food choices. Proponents of the slow food movement try to educate consumers about what its members consider the environmental, nutritional, and taste benefits of fresh, local foods.

== Health based criticisms ==
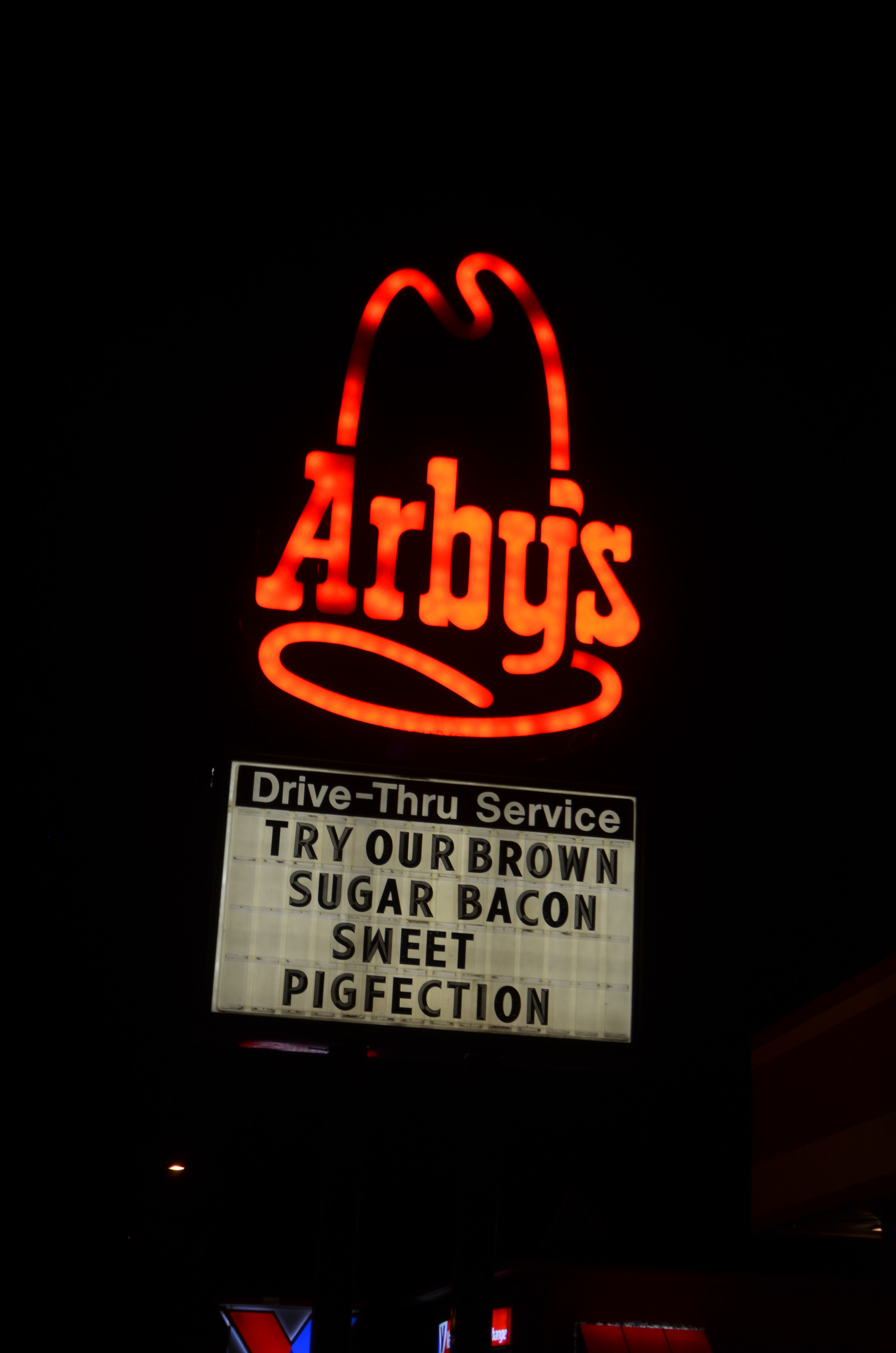
A sign advertising inclusion of highly processed meat and added sugar in a sandwich

Fast food often contains significant amounts of mayonnaise, cheese, salt, fried meat, and oil. These ingredients are typically high in calories and fat, contributing to their energy-dense nature (Schlosser). Consuming excessive amounts of such foods can lead to an unbalanced diet. Health experts, including dieticians, generally recommend a balanced diet that includes adequate proteins, vitamins, and minerals, while limiting excessive intake of fats and carbohydrates. The overconsumption of fast food has been associated with various health problems, including obesity and cardiovascular diseases. Additionally, research indicates that frequent consumption of fast food may negatively impact appetite regulation and respiratory system function., and central nervous system function (Schlosser). In a cross-sectional data study of more than 100,000 adolescents in 32 countries (including low-, middle-, and high-income countries), it was found that fast food is associated with an increase in suicide attempts.

According to the Massachusetts Medical Society Committee, fast foods are commonly high in fat content, and studies have found associations between fast food intake and increased body mass index (BMI) and weight gain. In particular, many fast foods are high in saturated fats, which are widely held to be a risk factor in heart disease. In 2010, heart disease was the number 1 ranking cause of death. A 2006 study fed monkeys a diet with a similar level of trans fats as that of a person who ate fast food frequently. Both diets contained the same overall number of calories. It was found that the monkeys who consumed higher levels of trans fat developed more abdominal fat than those fed a diet rich in unsaturated fats. They also developed signs of insulin resistance, an early indicator of diabetes. After six years on the diet, the trans fat fed monkeys had gained 7.2% of their body weight, compared to just 1.8% in the unsaturated fat group. A five-year study conducted in Singapore showed that frequent fast food consumers (more than twice a week) had a significant increased risk of developing type 2 diabetes and an increased risk of death from coronary heart disease, when compared to non-consumers. The American Heart Association recommends consumption of about 16 grams of saturated fats a day.

The director of the obesity program for the Children's Hospital Boston, David Ludwig, says that "fast food consumption has been shown to increase caloric intake, promote weight gain, and elevate risk for diabetes". The link between eating fast food and developing diabetes is a major cause for alarm. Consuming fast food on a daily basis has been linked to an increased risk of acquiring type 2 diabetes. Insulin resistance and impaired glucose metabolism are common health consequences of a diet heavy in processed carbs, bad fats, and added sweets found in fast food. Type 2 diabetes is a chronic, disabling disease with serious health effects, and its development is influenced by the aforementioned risk factors. Excessive calories are another issue with fast food. According to P. Block, R. Scribner and K. Desalvo, from "Fast Food, Race/Ethnicity, and Income: A Geographic Analysis", 2004, referring to a U.S. Department of Agriculture sponsored study, "the percentage of calories which can be attributed to fast-food consumption has increased from 3% to 12% of the total calories consumed in the United States from 1978 to 1995. In 1995, "away-from-home" foods provided 34% of total caloric intake and 38% of total fat intake compared to 18% for both categories in 1977–1978." A regular meal at McDonald's consists of a Big Mac, large fries, and a large Coca-Cola drink amounting to 1,430 calories. The USDA recommends a daily caloric intake of 2,700 and 2,100 kcal (11,300 and 8,800 kJ) for men and women (respectively) between 31 and 50, at a physical activity level equivalent to walking about 1.5 to 3 miles per day at 3 to 4 miles per hour in addition to the light physical activity associated with typical day-to-day life, with the French Agency for Food, Environmental and Occupational Health & Safety guidance suggesting roughly the same levels.

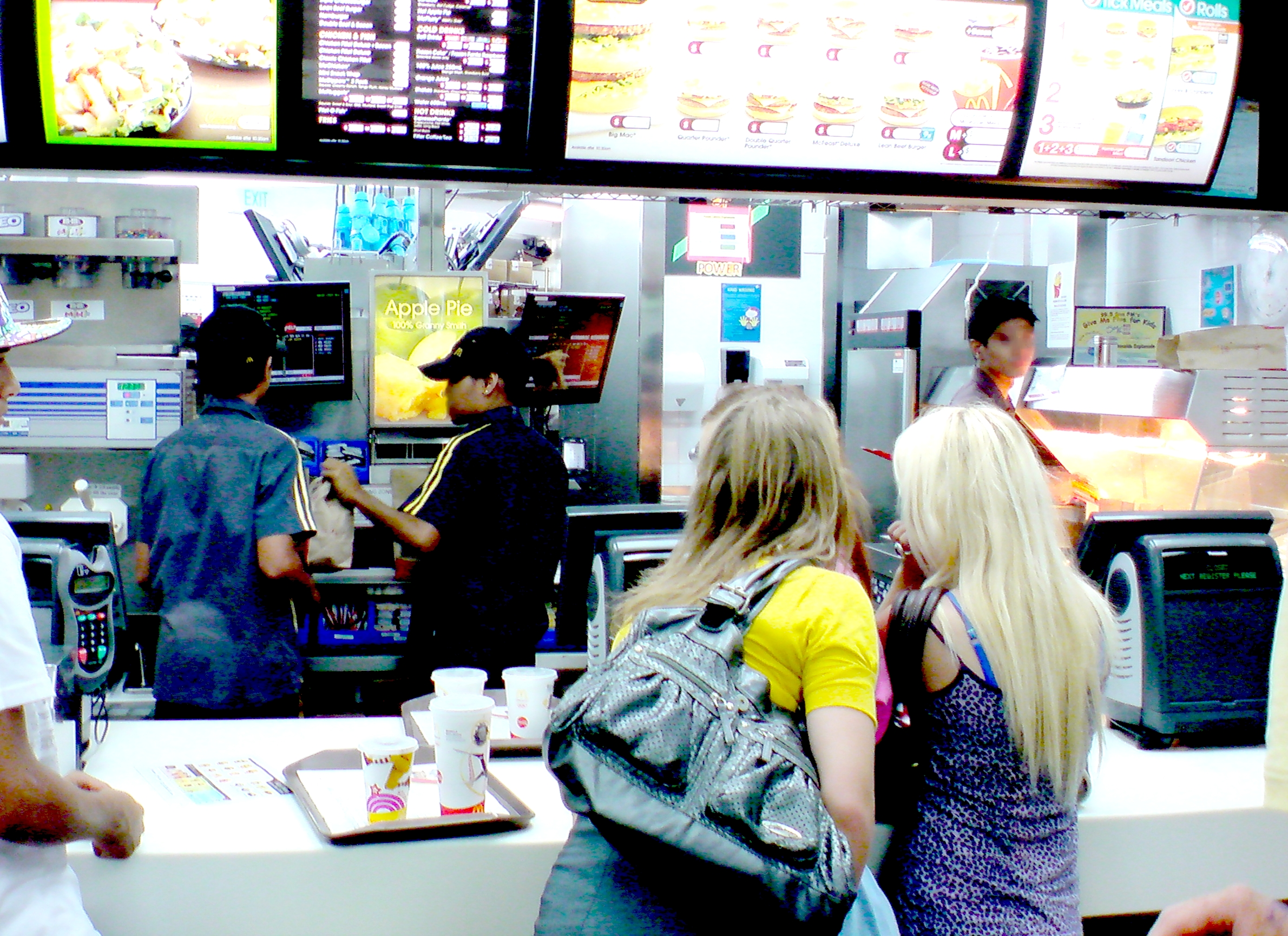
Students buying fast food

However, besides fast food consumption, there are many other reasons for overweight among children while they are growing, including sex development, "hormonal changes", and social interactions. At those moments young people can feel depressed, which may lead to increase or decrease in appetite. In fact, increased hunger may lead to obesity in some cases. "...seasonal effective disorder affects 1.7 – 5.5% of youths ages 9–19 years old based on a community study of over 2,000 youth."

The fast food chain D'Lites, founded in 1978, specialized in lower-calorie dishes and healthier alternatives such as salads. It filed for bankruptcy in 1987 as other fast food chains began offering healthier options. McDonald's has been attempting to offer healthier options besides salads. They have incorporated fruit and milk as options of Happy Meals and have promoted healthier ads and packaging for children. The Alliance for a Healthier Generation has set a standard in hopes of pressuring fast food companies to make recommended healthier adjustments.

=== Food-contact paper packaging ===
Fast food often comes in wrappers coated with polyfluoroalkyl phosphate esters (PAPs) to prevent grease from leaking through them. These compounds are able to migrate from the wrappers into the packaged food. Upon ingestion, PAPs are subsequently biotransformed into perfluorinated carboxylic acids (PFCAs), compounds which have long attracted attention due to their detrimental health effects in rodents and their unusually long half-lives in humans. While epidemiological evidence has not demonstrated causal links between PFCAs and these health problems in humans, the compounds are consistently correlated with high levels of cholesterol and uric acid, and PAPs as found on fast food packaging may be a significant source of PFCA contamination in humans.

=== Fast food and diet ===
Percent of obese adults and number of fast food restaurants in each state, 2011

On average, nearly one-third of U.S. children aged 4 to 19 eat fast food every day. Over the course of a year this is likely to result in a child gaining six extra pounds in weight. In a research experiment published in Pediatrics, 6,212 children and adolescents aged 4 to 19 were examined to extrapolate some information about fast food. Upon interviewing the participants in the experiment, it was reported that on any given day 30.3% of the total sample had eaten fast food. Fast-food consumption was prevalent in both males and females, in all racial/ethnic groups, and in all regions of the country.

Additionally, in the study children who ate fast food, compared to those who did not, tended to consume more total fat, carbohydrates, and sugar-sweetened beverages. Children who ate fast food also tended to eat less fiber, milk, fruits, and non-starchy vegetables. After reviewing these test results, the researchers concluded that consumption of fast food by children seems to have a negative effect on an individual's diet, in ways that could significantly increase the risk of obesity. Due to having reduced cognitive defenses against marketing, children may be more susceptible to fast food advertisements, and consequently have a higher risk of becoming obese. Fast food is only a minuscule factor that contributes to childhood obesity. A study conducted by researchers at The University of North Carolina at Chapel Hill's Gillings School of Global Public Health showed that poor diet and obesity as an overall factor are the leading causes of rising obesity rates in children. "While reducing fast-food intake is important, the rest of a child's diet should not be overlooked", said Jennifer Poti, co-author and doctoral candidate in the university's Department of Nutrition.

Contrary evidence has been documented that questions the correlation of a fast food diet and obesity. A 2014 People Magazine article recounts the experience, with a sample size of one, of John Cisna, a science teacher at Colo-NESCO High School, who ate a fast food diet for 90 days. At the end of 90 days he had lost 37 pounds and his cholesterol level went from 249 to 170. Cisna kept to a strict 2,000 calorie limit a day and walked 45 minutes a day. Harley Pasternak, a celebrity trainer and nutrition expert, supports Cisna's experiment by saying, "While I don't think it's a great idea to eat too much fast food... I do think he is right. Fast food, while far from healthy, doesn't make people gain weight. Eating too much fast food too often is what can make you gain weight—the same way eating too much of anything can pack on the pounds." A cross-sectional study in China shows that the relationship between BMI and times per week fast food consumption was not significant.

Jared Fogle's drastic weight loss on a Subway diet, which is considered a fast food chain, is another case that poses a fair debate against the idea that the culprit of obesity is fast food. Fogle dropped 235 pounds by consuming Subway sandwiches for lunch and dinner daily. With no cheese or mayonnaise, the calories of both sandwiches totaled less than 1,000 calories in a day.

Fast food labels without the calorie amount increase the risks of obesity. In the article of M. Mclnerney et al. is examined the impact of fast food labeling on college students' weight loss. In the study the students required to label the calories of fast foods in the items' lists. The results showed positive effects on the significance of weight loss among college students. Thus, fast food restaurants need to post the caloric content of their products to inform the consumers about their food choices in order to prevent obesity.

== Fast food commercials ==
A 2012, estimated report by the US Federal Trade Commission revealed a $7.9 billion marketing expenditure difference between expenditure on marketing to all audiences and expenditure on marketing strictly to children and adolescents. According to this report, Fast food industries spent approximately $9.7 billion on marketing food and beverages to the general audience while they spent only $1.8 billion on marketing to children and adolescents.

== Consumer responsibility ==
Spokespeople for the fast food industry claim that there are no good or bad foods, but instead there are good or bad diets. The industry has defended itself by placing the burden of healthy eating on the consumer, who freely chooses to consume their product outside of what nutritional recommendations allow.

Many fast food restaurants added labels to their menus by listing the nutritional information below each item. The intent was to inform consumers of the caloric and nutritional content of the food being served there and result in directing consumers to the healthier options available. However, reports do not display any significant drop in sales at sandwich or burger locations which highlights no change in consumer behavior even after food was labeled.

Fast food is also affordable on people's incomes and expenses relating to the regions they live. "Healthy foods including whole-grain products, low-fat dairy foods, and fresh fruits and vegetables may be less available, and relatively costlier, in poor and minority neighborhoods." So, fast food stores are located in the areas where the demand by the population is high.

Some other studies show that eating fast food is not dependent on a person's income. Researchers found that an amount of fast food consumed does not correlate with a person's income level. The article "Wealth doesn't equal health Wealth: Fast food consequences not just for poor", discusses the issue: not all rich people are healthy food consumers, nor do they consume fast food less frequently than poor people. Additionally, fast food customers work harder and longer than those who do not eat fast food daily.

A study conducted in 20 Fast Food restaurants in Australia showed that despite the availability of healthy meal options on the menu less than 3% of the consumers observed opted for a healthy meal which emulated results of other recent Australian research on consumption of healthy meals at Fast Food locations. In this 12-hour observational study, about 34% of meals purchased were take-away, meals that were excluded from the study, and 65% represented the unhealthy eat-in meals while the remaining 1% represented the healthy meals purchased.

Restrained eating, or excessive consumption of fast food and other unhealthy foods high in sugar and sodium, is a category of different eating habits derived from results of a cross-sectional study in 2014. This study depicted a prominent association between restrained eating and nurses working overnight shifts and those who are under high stress. Fruits and vegetables were reported as the least likely to be consumed under stress. About 395 nurses participated in this study. All these nurses were employees of two major hospitals in the capital city, Riyadh, of the Kingdom of Saudi Arabia.

The research gathered from a nationwide study in China strictly concentrated on the link between fast food consumption and the growing obesity epidemic in children, ranging from ages 6–18. Although end results were not completely inconclusive, there was no significant relationship found between the two. The variables taken into consideration to support and narrow the study showed that fast food consumption rates increased with the presence of any of the following variables: low-income households, peer influence, geographical location, pocket money and independence. Fast food consumption rates escalated when older children were surveyed whilst consumption rates for younger children appeared normal. Also, western fast food was preferred by children of all ages because they associated western fast food with high quality food.

"The McLawsuit" was a group of overweight children that filed a class action lawsuit against McDonald's seeking compensation for obesity related reasons.

== The CSR Halo Effect ==
The Corporate Social Responsibility (CSR) Effect is a phrase used to judge a category based on judgments from other similar categories or is in relation to them. To put it in terms of the fast food industry, a customer who had a bad experience at a McDonald's would associate that experience with other McDonald's, casting a per-conspired image in their mind of how all other McDonald's are. Ioannis Assiouras states that "positive prior CSR leads to higher sympathy and lower anger and schadenfreude toward the company, than negative prior CSR or lack of CSR information."

== Worker discrepancies and strikes ==
Many fast food employees are adults who earn minimum wage, which in the United States is around $7.25 for every hour. Around 60% of fast food workers are 25 years and older.

Many employees have protested to raise the minimum wage. On 5 December 2013, protesters from 100 cities in the United States held demonstrations for a $15 hourly wage. This protest was one of a series of strikes that began 2012, in New York City, protesting against low wages.

In the largest increase in decades, fast food workers have seen a 10% increase in pay since 2020.

There has been a study over employee wages at the fast food companies, the study suggests the fast food industry needs to increase an hourly payment from "7.25 to 10.25" for the beginners of the job. Besides, they recommend to rise that to 5 dollars after few years of experience. From that it is clear to understand that how increased minimum wages has its effects on employees services, life style, and well-being. Because workers start to work better when their life style changes as well as their payments.

== Fast food and the pandemic ==
The 2019 COVID-19 pandemic has created many challenges for businesses to stay afloat. The pandemic led to many business cutting hours for minimum wage workers, which led workers to seek new employment opportunities.

Fast food workers continue to face hostile work environments for those who choose to stay. They are already in a low paying job and need to go to work so they continue show up even if they show any symptoms due to lack of coverage and legislation that only support COVID-19 related illnesses. With two thirds of front line workers being women with a minor child at home, the only option is to show up for work.

Social distancing is not always an option in fast food restaurants due to limited space. Fast food workers were not always provided with proper PPE, one worker even cited utilizing the same mask for up to a week at a time. Both of these variables contributed to fast food workers being at a higher risk for contracting the virus.

The pandemic intensified the mental health issues that fast-food workers had already faced. On top of the known mental health issues, they now had a fear of losing their jobs, contracting COVID-19 and spreading the virus to others.

The fast food workers have said they have dealt with being sexually harassed and mentally abused. More than 60% of workers have experienced some form of abuse since the pandemic.

== Packaging waste ==
A 2011 study of litter in the San Francisco Bay Area by Clean Water Action found that nearly half of the litter present on the streets was fast food packaging. The Natural Resources Defense Council's paper "Waste and Opportunity 2015: Environmental Progress and Challenges in Food, Beverage, and Consumer Goods Packaging" reported that no fast food brands were meeting best practices for use of recycled materials or promotion of recycling of the used packaging. The EPA states that only a tiny proportion of the plastic waste generated by the fast food industry is recycled.

=== Disposable tableware as a business model ===
The use of disposable tableware shifts costs from in-house employment to the municipal waste stream. By convincing consumers to bus disposable tableware, mostly in the 1960-1975 time period, formula fast food restaurants were able to gain competitive advantage over full-service lunch counter operations, despite the additional cost of the disposable items. Some attempts at discouraging this have been made, but the custom of busing disposable items is still widespread. Other measures include "Carryout Bag" laws and restrictions on formula restaurants.

== Fast food industry's response to criticism ==
John Merritt, senior vice president of public affairs for Hardee's says their "strategy is not necessarily to move towards healthier items" but "to move towards more choice."

In 2013, McDonald's and Dunkin' Brands publicly pledged to transition out of their use of foam hot beverage cups. McDonald's has replaced foam with paper cups, but Dunkin' has not initiated transition. The use of foam cups can still be seen at Chick-fil-A, Burger King, and KFC. Chipotle uses aluminum meal lids that are made from 95% recycled material, but they do not have postconsumer recycling, so the lids that are left on-site are landfilled.

=== Animal cruelty ===
In 2015, a gruesome video clip of a T&S farm in Dukedom, Tennessee, was released by animal rights activists, where workers were caught abusing chickens. Tyson Foods, the company which delivers chicken nuggets to the fast food giant McDonald's, cancelled their contract with the farm stating "animal well-being" is their utmost priority. McDonald's supported Tyson Foods' decision and described the workers actions as unacceptable.

=== Nutrition and health ===
In 2013, McDonald's announced that they would include fruits and vegetables in their menu combinations. Don Thompson, McDonald's chief executive stated, "We've been trying to optimize our menu with more fruits and vegetables and giving customers additional choices when they come to McDonald's."

In 2016 the company replaced the high-fructose corn syrup in its hamburger buns with sugar and removed antibiotics that are "important to human medicine" from its chicken. They also removed artificial preservatives from their cooking oil, pork sausage patties, eggs served on the breakfast menu, and Chicken McNuggets. The skin, safflower oil and citric acid from the McNuggets was also replaced with pea starch, rice starch and powdered lemon juice. These changes were made in an effort to target "health-conscious consumers."

=== Source reduction ===
Many fast food chains have reduced their material usage by "lightweighting", or reducing material in a package by weight. McDonald's made over 10 reduction in packaging weight in 2012, such as a 48% reduction in the chicken sandwich paperboard carton, and an 18–28% reduction in its plastic cold cups. Starbucks has reduced their water bottle weight by 20% and cold cups by 15%.

=== Cage-free hens ===
Over 160 companies in the food sector announced that they are planning to shift to eggs from only cage-free hens, most by the year 2025. The list includes McDonald's, Dunkin' Donuts, Carl's Jr., Burger King, Denny's, Jack in the Box, Quiznos, Shake Shack, Starbucks, Sonic, Taco Bell, Wendy's, White Castle, and Subway, among others.

=== Proximity of fast food locations ===
A study of students who live within a half mile from fast food locations have been reported to consume fewer amounts of fruit and vegetables, consume more soda, and are more likely to be overweight. More other studies show that the exposure to poor-quality food environments has important effects on adolescent eating patterns and obesity. Therefore, it seems that policy interventions limiting the proximity of fast-food restaurants to schools could help reduce adolescent obesity.

== See also ==
- Criticism of fast food advertising
- McDonaldization
- McDonald's legal cases
- Burger King legal issues
- Food swamp
