= Leslie Cochran =

American peace activist, cross-dresser, urban outdoorsman and outspoken critic

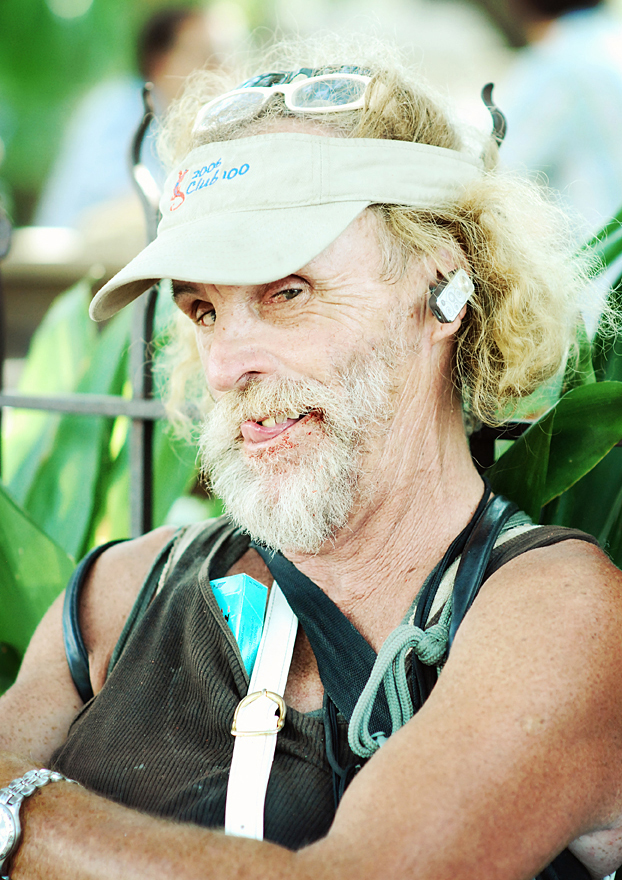
- Cochran on South Congress
- Born: June 24, 1951; Miami, Florida, U.S.
- Died: March 8, 2012 (aged 60); Austin, Texas, U.S.
- Resting place: Cook-Walden Capital Park Cemetery
- Education: Florida State University
- Occupation: Activist

Albert Leslie Cochran (June 24, 1951 – March 8, 2012) was an American homeless man, peace activist, cross-dresser, urban outdoorsman, and outspoken critic of police treatment of the homeless. Cochran was known in Austin as Leslie.

Cochran was considered the man who personified "Keep Austin Weird".

== Early life ==
Cochran was born on June 24, 1951, and raised in the Redland district of Homestead, Florida. He was the third of six children (three boys and three girls) born to Albert and Enid (née Atwater) Cochran, both now deceased, and had an identical twin brother who died at birth. He also has a cousin named Gabriel Lujan who lives in Round Rock, Texas. He had a rocky childhood, with his father verbally and sexually abusing him. He attended Florida State University in Tallahassee on an academic scholarship, but never graduated. He lived in the Pacific Northwest and at one time worked as a truck driver frequently traveling up and down the West Coast. Cochran told the Austin American-Statesman that he was briefly married from 1985 to 1986. In his 30s, he suffered a month long coma after a head injury, in which he lost his stutter. He spent nine months in the Naval Reserve in 1974–75, worked for Safeway grocery stores in Seattle, skinned road-kill in Colorado and tanned the hides, worked as a disc jockey near Steamboat Springs, Colorado, lived in a converted bookmobile in Shreveport, Louisiana, Tampa, Florida, and Atlanta, and then took a year to ride a tricycle to Austin in January 1996.

== As an Austin fixture ==
Cochran was typically seen around 6th Street and Congress during business hours, frequently wearing women's clothing. His most popular attire was a leopard thong and high-heeled shoes. Cochran always identified as a man.

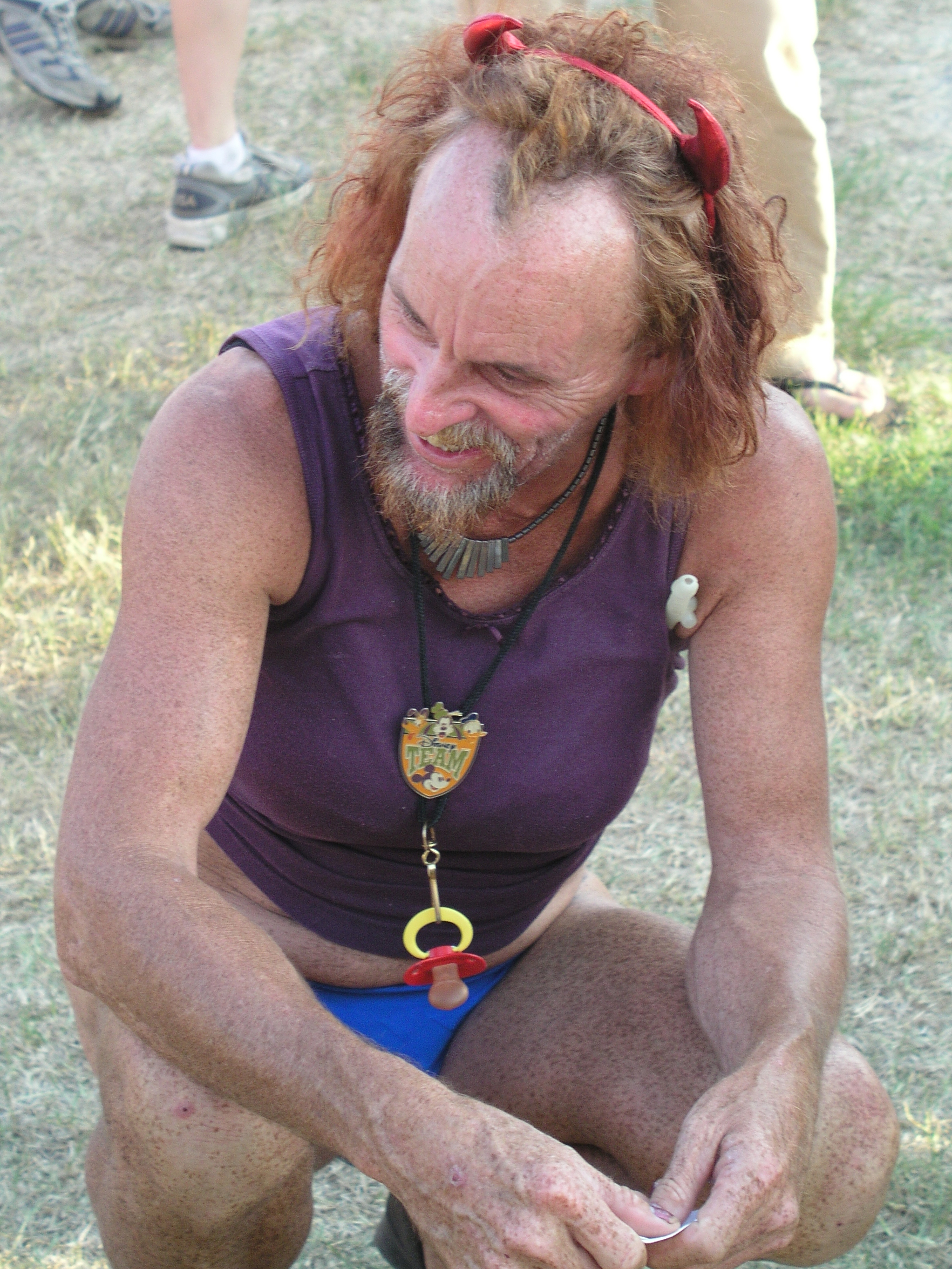
Leslie Cochran at the Keep Austin Weird 5K

Cochran ran for Mayor of Austin three times, with his final campaign in 2003. He earned a second-place finish in 2000, garnering 7.75% of the vote. He said his life on the streets advocating for police accountability was a good background for the job. He appeared with his boa and tiara at mayoral debates, but spoke about real issues. Cochran showed up for a mayoral campaign interview in 2003 wearing a women's business suit. "He looked like a stewardess from the golden age of air travel," said the Austin Chronicle editor. Cochran talked about problems ahead for a city that was creative and fun, but growing so fast that it could become big and bland. "He was talking about issues we are still talking about today, nearly a decade later, as Austin has grappled with change. He had actually thought about real issues that were facing the city, and not all of his ideas were particularly out there. He certainly wasn't the craziest person I ever dealt with running for office, by a long shot." If elected, Cochran promised to plant more trees and wear more conservative dresses to "respect the office."

Cochran was featured prominently in the 2010 book Weird City: Sense of Place and Creative Resistance in Austin, Texas. In the book, the author interviewed Cochran at Bouldin Creek Coffeehouse where they discussed such topics as Austin's rapid growth, commercialization, and the "Keep Austin Weird" campaign. He appeared on NBC's The Tonight Show with Jay Leno, wearing a thong. He did occasional odd jobs for local businesses and appeared in an ad for Pinky's Pagers that aired locally during the 2001 Super Bowl. He also worked as a model, and a local business lent him a three-wheeler bicycle with advertising to pedal around town.

== Merchandising ==
Cochran was featured in a set of collectible Leslie dress-up refrigerator magnets, with outfits like a leopard-print dress, cheerleader uniform and a miniskirt. The magnets were sold in local bookstores beginning in 2006, and Cochran received 20 percent of sales. In 2007, Cochran bought a large storage shed with his magnet earnings. He cut a deal with a woman in South Austin to put the shed in her yard, furnished the shed and moved into it.

In 2009, Costa Systems created the "iLeslie" iPhone application, sold by the Apple iTunes App Store. The application contains an assortment of sound bites by Cochran and two interviews where he recounted select experiences in Austin. Half of all profits went to Cochran.

== Death ==
Around 1:00 a.m. on the Saturday morning of October 3, 2009, Cochran was found unconscious outdoors and was transported to University Medical Center Brackenridge in critical condition. Within two weeks he had regained consciousness and was transferred to a rehabilitation center. When he was released, on October 23, 2009, Cochran reported that he had been attacked after commenting to a group of people about the dangers of drug abuse.

On February 27, 2012, St. David's South Austin Hospital confirmed Cochran was in their hospital in critical condition. The circumstances of his illness/injury were not known. Cochran had been in declining health since suffering his head injury in October 2009. On March 4, 2012, he regained consciousness after undergoing brain surgery two weeks prior. However, that was not considered a sign of improvement in his overall condition. Cochran was then moved to a local hospice, where he died on March 8, 2012, aged 60.

Cochran's death produced an outpouring of strong emotion and condolences. The Austin City Council observed a moment of silence in his honor. Austin Mayor Lee Leffingwell proclaimed March 8, 2012, and every March 8 forward Leslie Day in Austin. The official proclamation called him "an icon in the Keep Austin Weird scene" who provided "an indelible image" in the memories of many Austin visitors and tourists over the years. "He was an icon for the homeless in Austin, he represented them in so many ways. We will observe a moment of silence in his honor," said Leffingwell. "He represents just so much that is good about Austin. We're going to miss it and that little part of Austin is now gone forever," said Austin City Council member Mike Martinez. A "Love For Leslie" parade and public service march was held on March 8 from City Hall to 6th Street. Public visitation took place on March 9 at Cook-Walden Funeral Home, followed by a private funeral mass and burial. A public memorial service in his honor was held on March 11 at Auditorium Shores, attended by hundreds. Several editorials have since eulogized Cochran's death, painting a legacy that reflects upon his homeless advocacy as well as Austin's known tendencies toward eccentricity and tolerance.

In 2012, supporters and friends of Leslie led by actor Brently Heilbron organized Leslie Fest to pay tribute to the Austin icon and raise money for Hospice Austin.

== Sources ==
- Cinelli, Carla (2004). "Homeless Cross-Dresser - 'Leslie - The Queen of Austin'". Photogallery.
- Clark-Madison, Mike (March 14, 2003). "A Little Respect: All hail Leslie Cochran, Austin's queen of political soul". Austin Chronicle.
- Kelso, John (March 8, 2012). "Leslie's left the building, but we can't forget him". Austin American-Statesman. Archived from the original on March 10, 2012.
