= Cathedral of Junk =

Folk art structure in Austin, Texas

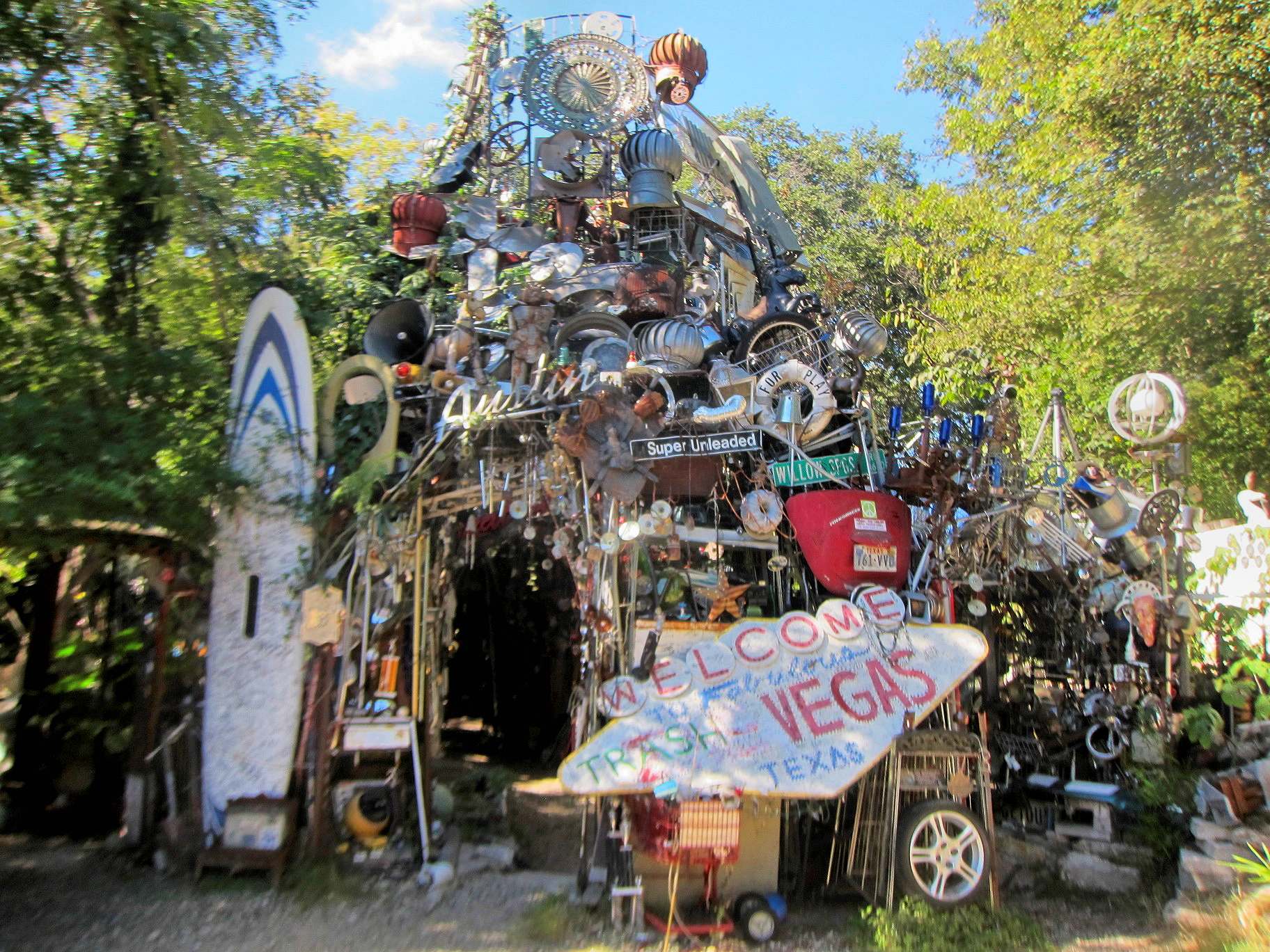
- Interactive map of the Cathedral of Junk area

General information
- Location: 4422 Lareina Dr, Austin, Texas 78745
- Coordinates: 30.218715°N 97.771775°W
- Construction started: 1988
- Completed: 2019
- Owner: Vince Hannemann

Technical details
- Floor count: 3

Design and construction
- Architect: Vince Hannemann
- Developer: Vince Hannemann

The Cathedral of Junk is a folk art structure located in the backyard of a private residence in the West Congress neighborhood of Austin, Texas, featuring a three-story, 30 ft tall "cathedral" weighing an estimated 50 tons.

In 2010, the Cathedral of Junk received national attention when Austin's code enforcement department found the structure to be in violation of city ordinances.

== History ==
Construction on the Cathedral of Junk started shortly after owner Vince Hannemann moved to Austin, Texas from Santa Fe, New Mexico in 1989.

By 1994, the Cathedral of Junk had started to receive media attention. At that time the Cathedral of Junk had "towers, connecting arches and a 16-foot high "pulpit"".

In early 2010, both the Houston Chronicle and The Daily Texan reported that Mr. Hannemann worked full-time on the structure, living "mostly off of donations from guests".

On March 9, 2010, Austin received a complaint from one of Mr. Hannemann's neighbors about the structure. In response, the city informed Mr. Hannemann that a certificate of occupancy and a building permit would be required and that electrical wiring would need to be removed. Mr. Hannemann was further told that failure to comply by March 31, 2010, would result in the city bulldozing the structure. Travis Habersaat volunteered to draw the blueprints needed to get a building permit but then, on June 15, 2010, after several extensions had been granted, Mr. Hanneman announced that he would be dismantling the Cathedral of Junk. "The city has made me alter the Cathedral so much that little of its original charm is left" Mr. Hanneman explained. On June 22, 2010, after a conversation with then mayor Lee Leffingwell, The Daily Texan reported that Mr. Hannemann had changed his mind, and on November 16, 2010, the city and Mr. Hannemann reached an agreement regarding the structure: the property would be zoned single family residential and the following restrictions would apply:

Mr. Hanneman must not advertise the structure as an event venue or public/tourist attraction, and must stop promoting the site on websites. The agreement does allow a few on-site events, such as private parties or occasional weddings, during the year. However, the owner must obtain the proper permits before holding any event. Current zoning requirements do not permit public events in residential areas zoned as single family because of compatibility issues such as excess noise, traffic, inadequate parking and sanitary facilities as well as other health and safety issues.

— City of Austin, KUT

In all, 30-40% of the structure (an estimated 30 tons) had been removed as a result of the permitting process. Additionally, the structure cannot exceed its current height and must be at least five feet from the fence.

In December 2019, Mr. Hanneman declared that "2019 is the year that she's 99 percent done."

== In popular culture ==
The Cathedral of Junk has been featured in the opening scene of Spy Kids 3-D: Game Over, the book Weird City by Joshua Long, in an episode of Texas Country Reporter , in an episode of The Daytripper, in a Discovery VR YouTube video and in YouTube videos by Time Out, Vice Media, CNN Business, and Voice of America. The Cathedral of Junk was also the set piece for a concert by Radiation City that was sponsored by Red Bull TV and GoPro.

The Cathedral of Junk was featured in an article in The Independent in 2026.

== See also ==
- Watts Towers
- The Orange Show
- Beer Can House
- Philadelphia's Magic Gardens
