= Brently Heilbron =

American actor (born 1976)

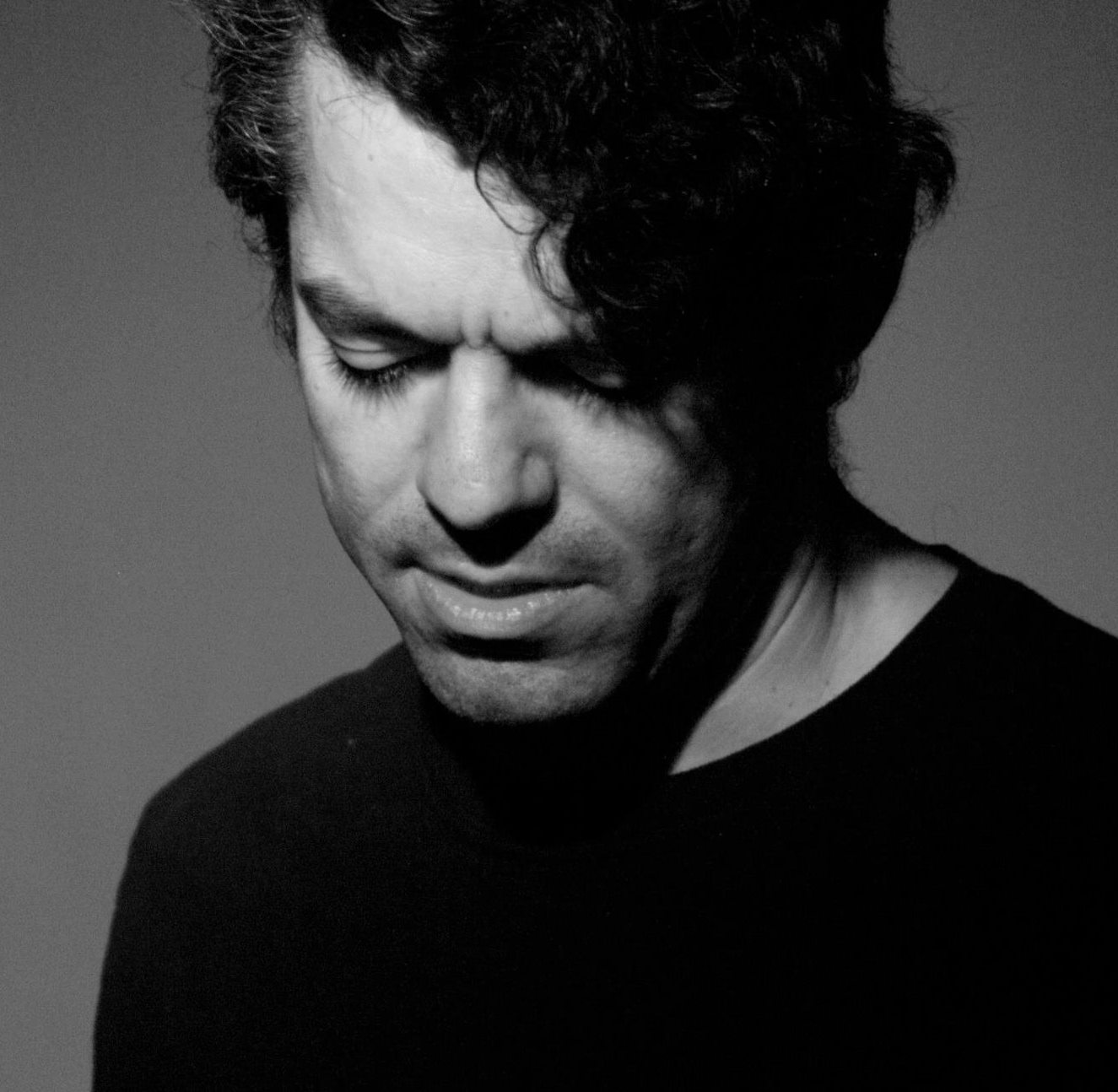
- Born: December 1, 1976 (age 49); Dallas, Texas
- Occupations: Actor, comedian, musician
- Known for: Fragile Rock Tiny Desk Concert
- Spouse: Elle Mahoney (m. 2020)
- Website: www.brently.net

Brently Heilbron (born December 1, 1976) is an American comedian, musician, and actor based in Austin, Texas. He is best known for Tiny Desk Concerts with emo puppet band Fragile Rock and his work with director Robert Rodriguez.

== Career ==
Brently Heilbron began performing standup comedy at the age of 15 in Dallas after skipping school to audition for a local comedy club. At age 17, he joined Monks' Night Out, which The Austin Chronicle later described as a leading Austin improv troupe of the 1990s. Two years later, he joined the University of Texas improv troupe Only 90% Effective.

In 1998, Heilbron presented two solo works at Austin's Momfest. Happytown was a work-in-progress interactive show about contemporary America; Wondrous Pudding of Joy drew on Sesame Street and surreal comedy. He took Wondrous Pudding of Joy to the HBO Workspace in Los Angeles for an industry showcase. Three days later, he performed a 10-minute set at the Improv, was approached about management, and began considering a move to Los Angeles.

That fall, Heilbron, Andy Fisher, Roy Koshy, and Leon Mandel were booked to perform their collaboration Bucket of Shins at Second City's Skybox Theatre in Chicago. In September, The Austin Chronicle named Heilbron Austin's best stand-up comic in its readers' poll and called him "one of the most prolific and inventive comics anywhere".

In 2007, he hosted Sir Paul McCartney's special live appearance at Amoeba Music. His verbatim performance of R. Kelly's Trapped in the Closet in its entirety earned him a mention in both a Los Angeles Times blog and The New York Times among others. On the stage, he was hand-picked by Woody Allen to appear in the Los Angeles Opera production of Gianni Schicchi. He has hosted and created the series Stand Up Empire on PBS, appeared in the Bravo improvised television series Significant Others, as well as season 5 of Friday Night Lights on NBC, The Lying Game on ABC Family, and The Leftovers on HBO.

In 2012, Heilbron led supporters and friends of Leslie Cochran in organizing Leslie Fest to pay tribute to the Austin icon and raise money for Hospice Austin.

In 2016, he created a comedy series for PBS called Stand Up Empire. In 2017, his emo puppet band Fragile Rock was featured on NPR's Tiny Desk Concerts.

In 2019, Heilbron worked with director Robert Rodriguez twice; as the psychotic Doc Sock in Red 11 and superhero Crushing Low in We Can Be Heroes.

In 2020, Heilbron appeared in the Netflix film We Can Be Heroes, in which the characters of The Adventures of Sharkboy and Lavagirl in 3-D also appeared. Forty-four million families watched the film in its first four weeks, and shortly afterward, it was announced that Rodriguez would be developing a sequel for Netflix. As of 2023, it was the sixth-most-streamed Netflix film of all time.

In 2022, it was announced that Fragile Rock would return to SXSW for a sixth time.

In 2023, Heilbron wrote the book and songs for a "FuQusical" about a young Greg Abbott.

In 2024, he appeared as a storyteller on The Moth mainstage in Austin, Texas and aired in September, 2026 on NPR

== Discography ==
In 2018, he wrote and performed "Wakeup To The Breakup" released by Fragile Rock.. In 2025 the band released their second album Microfamous, also written by Heilbron.

The cast recording of Young Greg Abbott was released in 2024.
