= Austin Independent Business Alliance =

Trade association in Austin, Texas, US

Austin Independent Business Alliance (AIBA) is an organization of independent, locally owned firms in Austin, Texas and is composed of over 300 member businesses. It was started in 2001 by several local businesses and citizens as a way to help independent businesses compete successfully against corporate chains. The group is among at least 60 Independent Business Alliances around the country affiliated with the American Independent Business Alliance.

The slogan "Keep Austin Weird" was adopted by the AIBA to promote independent locally owned businesses.

In 2022 the organization rebranded as the Austin Local Business Alliance (ALBA).
