= AIBA (disambiguation) =

AIBA usually refers to the International Boxing Association (amateur), the world amateur boxing governing body. AIBA may also refer to:

- Austin Independent Business Alliance, an organization of independent, locally owned businesses in Austin, Texas, US
- Australian International Beer Awards, an international competitive brewing event
