= Fragile Rock =

American comedy rock band

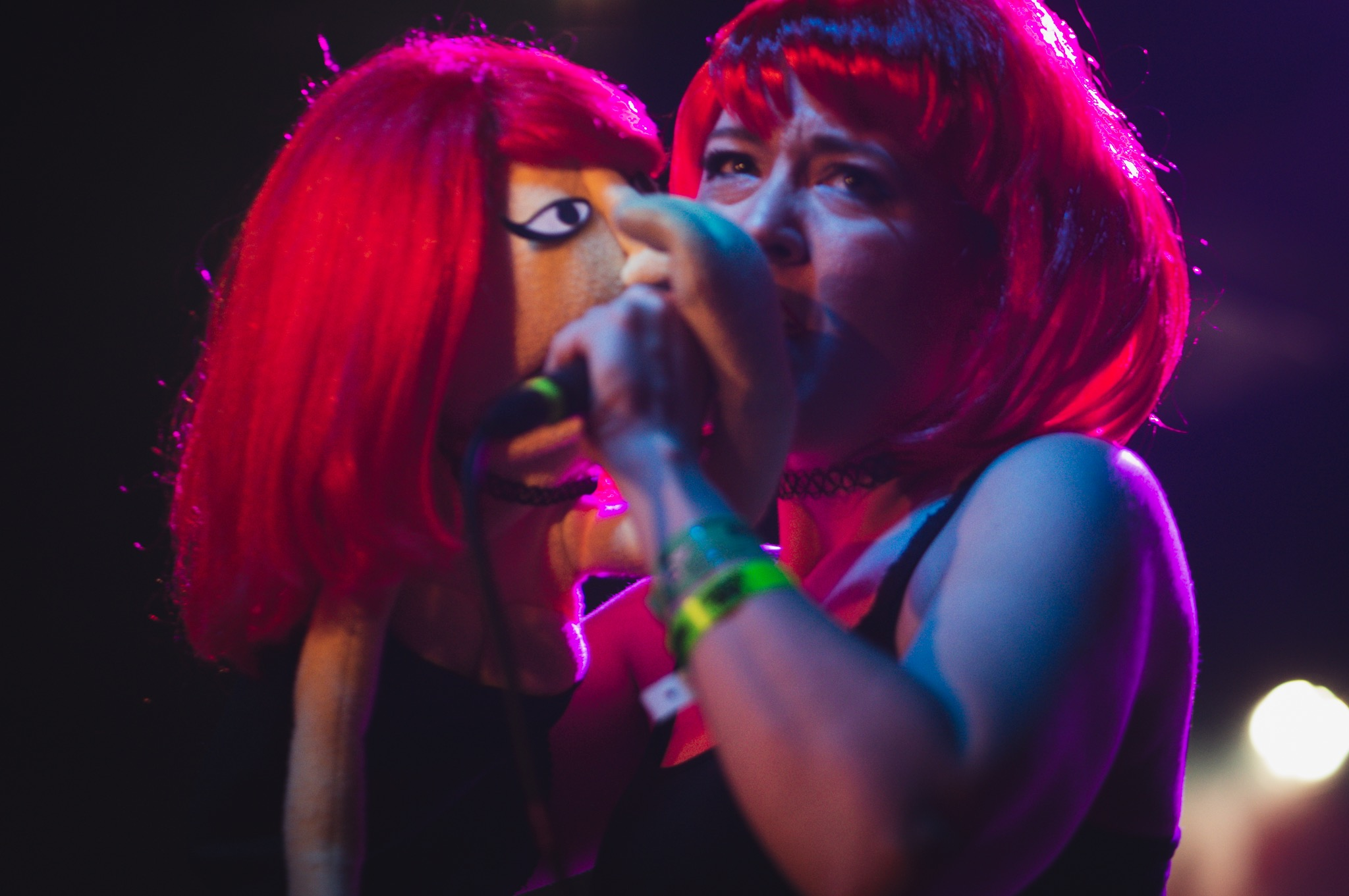
- Fragile Rock performing at SXSW in 2019

Background information
- Origin: Austin, Texas, U.S.
- Genres: Comedy rock, emo
- Years active: 2014–present
- Label: Tin Pan Pally (ASCAP)
- Members: See Members section
- Website: www.fragilerockband.com

Fragile Rock is an American musical collective of musicians and puppeteers, described as an "emo puppet band." The band formed in Austin, Texas in 2014 as the brainchild of musician and writer Brently Heilbron. The band's name is a play on Fraggle Rock, the children's puppet show, as well as a reference to the band's self-described "emo" music. Heilbron plays Milo S., a self-described "partist" (poet and artist), who fronts the fictional band. The project has released two studio albums: 2017's Wake Up to the Break-Up and 2025's Microfamous.

== History ==
In the fictional back-story of Fragile Rock, Milo forms the band with the only person who auditioned to play guitar, Kyle Danko. They are later joined by drummer Coco Bangs, as well as backing vocalists The Cocteau Triplets (a play on the Cocteau Twins) and Milo's apparent former love interest, Nic Hole, on bass. Their live shows often involve S. and Hole getting involved with personal arguments, comically derailing the performance. An ongoing subject of conflict is a romance between Nic Hole and actor Elijah Wood. Wood played along in a 2016 appearance at Fantastic Fest, admitting that he was "in love with Nic Hole." The characters of Milo and Nic are loosely based on the real-life relationship of Heilbron and Megan Thornton, who plays Nic.

The puppets were created by Shaun Branigan. A music video directed by Jessica Gardner for the song "I Am Sad (And So Am I)" was released on YouTube in January 2015.

After an initial theatrical run in 2015, the band began playing music venues. They were invited to appear on the reality series America's Got Talent in 2016 but their appearance was never aired. This experience was documented in the article entitled "Brutality Television" for the Austin Chronicle. The attention from this, however, earned them a spot in the official South by South West 2017 lineup. Bob Boilen featured Fragile Rock as a post-festival highlight in a podcast for All Songs Considered.

Fragile Rock released their debut EP, Weepy, in February 2017. It was followed by the release of their debut studio album, Wake Up to the Break-Up, in June. In July, the band appeared on NPR as a part of the Tiny Desk Concert series. The final song of the performance was "Fairuza Balk," a track from the album named after the American actress. In response to the performance, Balk tweeted that the dedication "made [her] year," calling the performance "wonderful an[d] hilarious."

In 2018, Fragile Rock returned to South by Southwest as an official showcasing artist where they were voted one of the top 10 acts to see at the festival by Yahoo! music They returned in 2019, playing NPR's Tiny Desk showcase with Wyclef Jean, Amanda Palmer, Gaelynn Lea, and Amelia Meath of Sylvan Esso and Mountain Man. Variety noted them in their "Best Music We Saw at SXSW" article. After SXSW, Fragile Rock was referred to as "the perfect festival act". In 2019, they were named by NPR as one of the Top 5 Most Uplifting Tiny Desk Concerts of all time in a list that includes Lizzo, Superorganism, Dan Deacon, and Mucca Pazza. In 2020, NPR also named the band one of the Top 5 Funniest Tiny Desk Concerts of all time in a list which included "Weird Al" Yankovic and Reggie Watts. It was announced that they would be returning to SXSW in 2023 as a showcasing artist. In 2025, the band released its second album Microfamous, which was released both digitally and – for the first time in the band's career – on vinyl.

== Members ==
Current fictional members

- Milo S. – lead vocals (2014–present)
- Nic Hole – bass guitar, backing and occasional lead vocals (2014–present)
- Kyle Danko – guitar, backing vocals (2014–present)
- The Cocteau Triplets – backing vocals (2014–present)
- Drum Machine 3000 – drums (2018–present)

Former fictional members

- Coco Bangs – drums (2014-2018)

Actual members

- Brently Heilbron – vocals, lyrics, puppeteer (Milo S.) (2014–present)
- Megan Thornton – vocals, puppeteer (Nic Hole) (2014–present)
- Chadwick Smith – vocals, puppeteer (Kyle Danko) (2014–present)
- Emily Cawood – vocals, puppeteer (The Cocteau Triplets) (2014–present)
- Bryan Curry - vocals, puppeteer (The Cocteau Triplets) (2014–present)
- Ryan Hill – guitar (2014–present)
- Wes Armstrong – drums (2018–present)
- Danny Garrison – bass (2021–present)
- Nick Lombard – keyboards (2021–present)

Former actual members

- Jennifer Monsees – bass (2018–2021)
- Kim Stacy – vocals, puppeteer (The Cocteau Triplets) (2014-2017)
- Cindy Page – bass (2014-2018)
- Jayme Ramsay – drums (2014-2018)
- Taylor Love – vocals, puppeteer (Coco Bangs) (2014-2018)
- Luke Wallens – puppeteer (Coco Bangs) (2014-2018)

== Discography ==
Studio albums

- Wake Up to the Break-Up (2017)
- Microfamous (2025)

EPs

- Weepy (2017)
