= Formula restaurant =

Type of business

Interior of a Burger King restaurant in Tiller Torget, Trondheim.

A formula restaurant is a type of formula retail business. It is characterized as a restaurant regulated by contractual or other arrangements to standardize menus, ingredients, food preparation, interior and exterior design and/or uniforms. The term refers to the characteristics of the restaurant rather than its ownership, following a business model controlled by an overseeing corporation. Most formula restaurants are chain restaurants, though this does not have to be the case.

In legal definitions, there may be a minimum number of "substantially identical" restaurants for them to be considered formula restaurants. This number varies across jurisdictions.

== Formula retail ==
Formula retail is a type of sales activity required by contractual or other arrangements to offer a standardized array of services and/or merchandise, trademark, interior or exterior design and/or uniforms. This applies to the restaurant industry where menus, ingredients and food preparation may be standardized according to the overseeing corporation's business model, intended to maximize marketing potential.

=== Comparison with chain restaurants ===
Although there is considerable financial overlap, "chain restaurant" refers to ownership or franchise while "formula restaurant" refers to the characteristics of the business. A formula restaurant does not need to belong to a chain but it generally does. Nevertheless, most codified municipal regulation relies on definitions of formula restaurant or formula retail (although non-codified restrictions will sometimes target "chains").

Some chain restaurants are not considered formula restaurants because the chain does not maintain a formulaic or monolithic character at different locations, or has few enough locations that they are substantially dissimilar to what is commonly considered to be a formula restaurant. In addition, the term "chain restaurants" generically describes a business arrangement, whereas formula restaurants describe the aesthetic characteristics and customer experience.

=== Disguised formula restaurants ===
In some cases, a chain may establish a set of formula restaurants but attempt to present each venue as unique. This is common with hotel chains, which rely on centralized meal planning and management, but want to avoid the appearance of their in-house dining facilities being formulaic. Generally, the local manager is encouraged to modify the corporate menu so as to present the appearance of a unique character, while still building the menu around a corporate model (e.g., several entrees based on frozen chicken breast in accordance with a corporate formula). Disguised formula restaurants may be recognized by marketing indicators: intense use of staged photographs on the menu, frequent use of marketing buzzwords (or marketing terms) such as "add" listed under multiple menu items.

== Criticism ==
=== Cultural ===
Concerns have been expressed that formula restaurants detract from the unique characteristics of cities and towns. The standardization of menus can mean fewer choices for consumers. Formula restaurants tend to be marketing centric or based on perception.

=== Economic ===
Formula restaurants can harm local independent businesses. Formula restaurants accelerate gentrification but deteriorate quality of life.

Formula restaurants often rely on an economic model that encourages the use of disposable tableware. This can create a negative economy in waste and food distribution, in part to support the business model of the controlling corporation.

== Response and regulation ==
=== Informal restrictions ===
- Ketchum, Idaho has traditionally restricted franchise restaurants through the zoning approval process. The city has no formal formula restaurant ordinances.
- Iceland has informal health restrictions that discourage some formula restaurants.

=== Formal restrictions ===
- Malibu, California compiled a list of municipalities that restrict formula retail.
- Bermuda has banned all franchised restaurants in the country (Prohibited Restaurant Act of 1997).

=== Legal challenges ===
In the United States, legal restrictions on formula restaurants (and formula retail in general) have been challenged as an impermissible restriction on interstate commerce, and as exceeding municipal zoning authority. Restrictions are generally held permissible if they are not arbitrary, and directed to the character of the business and not the ownership.

== See also ==
- Chain store
