= Weird City =

2010 book by Joshua Long

- Author: Joshua Long
- Language: English
- Subject: Geography, Urban Studies, Sociology, Anthropology
- Publisher: University of Texas Press
- Publication date: 2010
- Pages: 221
- ISBN: 978-0-292-72206-4

Weird City: Sense of Place and Creative Resistance in Austin, Texas is a non-fiction scholarly text by Joshua Long published in 2010 by University of Texas Press. The book uses the "Keep Austin Weird" movement as a central focus to discuss the social, cultural and economic changes occurring in Austin, Texas, at the beginning of the 21st century. Largely written from a human geography perspective, Weird City is intended to show the relationship between sense of place and urban economies, the environment, and the urban cultural landscape.

According to Long, Weird City is a scholarly text written for a mainstream audience including citizens of Austin and other "weird" cities, as well as students of geography, sociology, anthropology and urban studies.

Joshua Long is an assistant professor of environmental studies at Southwestern University.

== Critical reception ==
Weird City has received a welcome reception from local Austin media, including articles featured in the Austin Chronicle and the Austin American Statesman. Scholarly critical reception has also been positive. In a review published in the American Journal of Sociology, Richard Lloyd writes:

Long, an Austin native, pulls off the neat trick of persuasively earning insider status while also achieving critical distance sufficient to identify the many contradictions and inconsistencies contained within local discourses of "creative resistance." Austin itself is, of course, great material, with a lineup of local characters, icons, and landmarks that persuasively earn its claims to weirdness. Long, an exceptional writer, brings the richness of the milieu and passions of recent controversies vividly to life. The book is thus both an excellent depiction of Austin and its recent history, and an exceptional addition to the growing scholarship on the "creative cities" phenomenon.

Mentioned in an American Quarterly review of three 2010 UT Press publications on Austin, Andrew Busch notes the following:

Weird City is notable for its ability to illustrate the relationship between sense of place and resistance lucidly; residents who fought to preserve local businesses, for example, and avoid "Houstonization" consciously created meaning for Austin. In an increasingly competitive environment, successful cities must be acutely aware of how they are viewed by potential residents, businesses, and other sources of capital. In Austin, as elsewhere, creating social movements and local culture that are perceived as authentic is paramount to this success, which Long recognizes.

However, Busch also criticizes Long both for an elitist form of "Austin Exceptionalism" and for not fully addressing social justice issues affecting minority populations in Austin:

Long, for example, avoids analysis of gentrification on Austin’s east side, the historically African American and Latino neighborhoods, even though displacement has been acute there for a decade: he focuses instead on middle-class gentrification in predominantly white contemporary South Austin.

Much of Long's other scholarship on Austin is heavily focused on social and environmental justice issues in the neighborhoods referenced by Busch.

In 2010 the book was nominated for the National Council on Public History Book Award.

== Interviews and reviews ==
- Dunbar, Wells. "Viva la Resistance." Austin Chronicle, June 4, 2010.
- Dunbar, Wells. The Daily Hustle: 6/3/10. Austin Chronicle, June 3, 2010.
- Ergenbright, Kate. "Austin Expansion Inspires Book." The Daily Texan, July 18, 2010.
- Kobierowski, David. "http://www.austinpost.org/content/the-legend-keep-austin-weird." Austin Post, April 23, 2011.
- NPR: State of the Re:Union "Austin: Growing Pains"
- Tanney, Katherine. "Is Austin still that weird? Maybe for now..." Austin American Statesman, August 7, 2010.
- Wesley, Peter. "Joshua Long's Weird City and the Future of ATX." BookPeople Blog. July 12, 2010.

== See also ==
- Human Geography
- Keep Austin Weird
- Sense of place
- Leslie Cochran
