= American Independent Business Alliance =

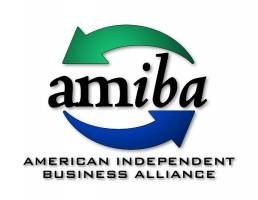
AMIBA logo

The American Independent Business Alliance (AMIBA) is a non-profit organization that represents the interests of local independent businesses, helps communities develop strong local economies through nurturing local entrepreneurs, and promotes citizen engagement in local economic development. AMIBA helps communities to: launch and successfully operate "buy local" campaigns; facilitate group purchasing and marketing among local businesses, and; other programs to support community enterprise.

Many of these communities form Independent Business Alliances to strengthen and sustain community-based businesses while strengthening local economies and preventing chains and other remotely controlled businesses from driving out locals.

== Local independent businesses ==
AMIBA defines a local independent business as:

- Private, employee, community, or cooperative ownership
- At least 50% owned by area residents
- Full decision-making authority for the business lies with its local owner(s)
- A limited number and geographic range of business locations (determined by local affiliates based on their circumstances)

== Independent Business Alliance ==
The term Independent Business Alliance refers to local affiliates of the AMIBA. According to AMIBA's website, "An IBA is a coalition of locally-owned independent businesses, citizens and community organizations united to support home town businesses in a community or geographic region...The AMIBA aims to help seed, support and network these alliances."

The first Independent Business Alliance (IBA) originated in Boulder, Colorado in 1998 and developed the model that has been advanced by more than 60 local IBAs affiliated with the AMIBA in the United States and Canada. Their organizing model also has been emulated by dozens of other groups. Independent Business Alliances exist in communities ranging from 1,800 to several million residents. Collectively, these IBAs represent about 24,000 independent businesses.

The name Independent Business Alliance is a trademark of the AMIBA that applies specifically and exclusively to its affiliates.

== History ==
The AMIBA is a 501c(3) educational organization, incorporated in 2001 by Jeff Milchen and Jennifer Rockne, who previously led the Boulder Independent Business Alliance (in Colorado), the first such alliance in the U.S. Derek Peebles became the executive director in July 2019.

AMIBA often supports positions that contrast with other national business organizations such as the U.S. Chamber of Commerce, that advance policies favoring large or global corporations. For example, AMIBA argues for keeping corporations out of electioneering activities.

== Board of directors ==
The organization is directed by a board composed primarily of leaders of local affiliates.

- Colin Murray, director of Dane County Buy Local
- Kristi Streiffert, Durango, Colorado
- Laury Hammel, executive director, SBN Massachusetts, Boston, Massachusetts
- George Farah, partner, Cohen Milstein
- Jennifer Rubenstein, director, Louisville IBA
- Lily Brislen, director, University of Kentucky Food Connections
- Tom Lowenburg, owner, Octavia Books, New Orleans, Louisiana
- Kristen Lavalette, director, Local First Utah
