= List of omega-3 fatty acids =

Omega-3 fatty acids are polyunsaturated fatty acids (PUFAs). Omega−3 fatty acids are important for normal metabolism.

Mammals are unable to synthesize omega−3 fatty acids, but can obtain the shorter-chain omega−3 fatty acid ALA (18 carbons and 3 double bonds) through diet and use it to form the more important long-chain omega−3 fatty acids, EPA (20 carbons and 5 double bonds) and then from EPA, the most crucial, DHA (22 carbons and 6 double bonds).

== List of omega-3 fatty acids ==
Common name	Lipid name	Chemical name
α-Linolenic acid (ALA)	18:3 (n−3)	octadeca-9,12,15-trienoic acid
Stearidonic acid (SDA)	18:4 (n−3)	octadeca-6,9,12,15-tetraenoic acid
Eicosatetraenoic acid (ETA)	20:4 (n−3)	eicosa-8,11,14,17-tetraenoic acid
Eicosapentaenoic acid (EPA)	20:5 (n−3)	eicosa-5,8,11,14,17-pentaenoic acid
Docosapentaenoic acid (DPA)	22:5 (n−3)	docosa-7,10,13,16,19-pentaenoic acid
Docosahexaenoic acid (DHA)	22:6 (n−3)	docosa-4,7,10,13,16,19-hexaenoic acid
Tetracosahexaenoic acid (Nisinic acid)	24:6 (n−3)	tetracosa-6,9,12,15,18,21-hexaenoic acid

== List of foods with omega-3 fatty acids ==
Grams of omega−3 per 3 oz (85 g) serving
Common name	grams omega−3
Flax	11.4
Hemp	11.0
Herring, sardines	1.3–2
Mackerel: Spanish/Atlantic/Pacific	1.1–1.7
Salmon	1.1–1.9
Halibut	0.60–1.12
Tuna	0.21–1.1
Swordfish	0.97
Greenshell/lipped mussels	0.95
Tilefish	0.9
Tuna (canned, light)	0.17–0.24
Pollock	0.45
Cod	0.15–0.24
Catfish	0.22–0.3
Flounder	0.48
Grouper	0.23
Mahi mahi	0.13
Red snapper	0.29
Shark	0.83
King mackerel	0.36
Hoki (blue grenadier)	0.41
Gemfish	0.40
Blue eye cod	0.31
Sydney rock oysters	0.30
Tuna, canned	0.23
Snapper	0.22
Mutton	0.12
Eggs, large regular	0.109
Strawberry or Kiwifruit	0.10-0.20
Broccoli	0.10-0.20
Barramundi, saltwater	0.100
Giant tiger prawn	0.100
Lean red meat	0.031
Turkey	0.030
Milk, regular	0.00

== List of omega-3 oils ==
Oil	Diet type	ω−3 content
Avocado oil	Fruit/Vegetable	0.03%
Olive oil	Fruit/Vegetable	0.7%
Linseed oil/Flaxseed oil	Seed	51.9% – 55.2%
Hemp oil	Seed	22%
Walnut oil	Seed	14%
Canola oil	Seed	9% - 11%
Soybean oil	Seed	7% - 10%
Mustard oil	Seed	6%
Pumpkin seed oil	Seed	0.01% - 15%
Algae oil	Algae/Kelp	
Fish oil	Fish	
Cod liver oil	Fish	
Shark liver oil	Fish	
Seal oil	Pinniped	
Krill oil	Krill	
Perilla oil	Seed	

== See also ==
- Fatty acid
- Essential fatty acid
- Essential nutrient
