= FADS2 =

Enzyme found in humans

Identifiers
- Aliases: FADS2, D6D, DES6, FADSD6, LLCDL2, SLL0262, TU13, fatty acid desaturase 2
- External IDs: OMIM: 606149; MGI: 1930079; GeneCards: FADS2
Enzyme activity
EC #	BRENDA	ExPASy	KEGG	MetaCyc
1.14.19.3	↗	↗	↗	↗

Gene location (Human)
Chr.	Chromosome 11 (human)
Band	11q12.2	Start	61,792,980 bp
Band	11q12.2	End	61,867,354 bp

Gene location (Mouse)
Chr.	Chromosome 19 (mouse)
Band	19|19 A	Start	10,040,129 bp
Band	19|19 A	End	10,079,110 bp
RNA expression pattern
Bgee	Human / Mouse (ortholog); Top expressed in: right adrenal cortex; left adrenal cortex; ganglionic eminence; ventricular zone; stromal cell of endometrium; skin of thigh; amygdala; hypothalamus; islet of Langerhans; smooth muscle tissue / Top expressed in: otic vesicle; adrenal gland; saccule; otic placode; habenula; dentate gyrus of hippocampal formation granule cell; optic nerve; dorsomedial hypothalamic nucleus; right kidney; ventricular zone; More reference expression data
BioGPS	n/a
Gene ontology
Molecular function	stearoyl-CoA 9-desaturase activity; oxidoreductase activity; linoleoyl-CoA desaturase activity
Cellular component	integral component of membrane; integral component of plasma membrane; endoplasmic reticulum membrane; membrane; endoplasmic reticulum
Biological process	unsaturated fatty acid biosynthetic process; alpha-linolenic acid metabolic process; linoleic acid metabolic process; fatty acid biosynthetic process; lipid metabolism; fatty acid metabolic process
Sources:Amigo / QuickGO
Orthologs
Databases	NCBI: entry; OMA: entry
Species	Human	Mouse
Entrez	9415	56473
Ensembl	ENSG00000134824	ENSMUSG00000024665
UniProt	O95864	Q9Z0R9
RefSeq (mRNA)	NM_001281501; NM_001281502; NM_004265	NM_019699
RefSeq (protein)	NP_001268430; NP_001268431; NP_004256	NP_062673
Location (UCSC)	Chr 11: 61.79 – 61.87 Mb	Chr 19: 10.04 – 10.08 Mb
PubMed search
- Wikidata
View/Edit Human	View/Edit Mouse

Fatty acid desaturase 2 (FADS2) is an enzyme that in humans is encoded by the FADS2 gene.

== Function ==
=== Desaturation ===
The protein encoded by the FADS2 gene is a member of the fatty acid desaturase (FADS) gene family. It has three catalytic activities acting on fatty-acid-CoA:

- As a Delta 6 desaturase, it desaturates omega-3 and omega-6 polyunsaturated fatty acids at the delta-6 position, catalyzing the first and rate-limiting step in the formation of tetracosapentaenoic acid and tetracosahexaenoic acid.
- As a Delta 8 desaturase, desaturation at the delta-8 position.
- As a Delta 4 desaturase, desaturation at the delta-4 position.

Desaturase enzymes (such as those encoded by FADS2) cause desaturation of fatty acids through the introduction of double bonds between defined carbons of the fatty acyl chain. FADS family members are considered fusion products composed of an N-terminal cytochrome b5-like domain and a C-terminal multiple membrane-spanning desaturase portion, both of which are characterized by conserved histidine motifs. This gene is clustered with family members FADS1 and FADS2 at 11q12-q13.1; this cluster is thought to have arisen evolutionarily from gene duplication based on its similar exon/intron organization.

=== Re-esterification ===
Separately from its function in synthesizing EPA and DHA, D6D plays a contributory role in fatty acid re-esterification, required for the return of unoxidized free fatty acids into white adipose tissue as triglycerides.

== Agonists and inhibiting factors ==
D6D is upregulated by estrogen, low levels of omega-3s, and moderate food restriction (up to 300%).

D6D activity slows with age, suggested by reductions in GLA and subsequent metabolites. Other inhibiting factors include alcohol, radiation, and diabetes.

The conversion rate of ALA into DHA is vulnerable to suppression by dietary fatty acids. ALA intake greater than 1% and total polyunsaturated intake above 3% were found to drastically limit synthesis of EPA and DHA.

== Clinical significance ==
D6D deficiency can result in deficiencies in DHA, and in GLA and its metabolites dihomo-gamma-linolenic acid (DGLA) and prostaglandin E_{1} (PGE_{1}).

=== Sperm quality ===
It is implicated in abnormal sperm production due to deficiency in DHA and atopic dermatitis due to deficiencies in GLA and PGE_{1}.

=== Intelligence in breast-fed children ===
An early study claimed to find an association between FADS2 and the IQ of breastfed children, but this result failed to be replicated in later studies. In particular, the original study reported that breastfed children with the rs174575 "C" version of the gene had an IQ (intelligence quotient) 7 points higher than those with the less common rs174575 "G" version (less than this when adjusted for maternal IQ).

An attempt to replicate this study in 5934 8-year-old children failed: No relationship of the common rs174575 C allele to negative effects of formula feeding was apparent, and contra to the original report, the rare rs174575 GG homozygote children performed worse when formula fed than other children on formula milk. A study of over 700 families recently found no evidence for either main or moderating effects of the original SNP (rs174575), nor of two additional FADS2 polymorphisms (rs1535 and rs174583), nor any effect of maternal FADS2 status on offspring IQ.
