= Linoleoyl-CoA desaturase =

Class of enzymes

linoleoyl-CoA desaturase

Identifiers
- EC no.: 1.14.19.3
- CAS no.: 9014-34-0
- Alt. names: D6D, FADS2, acyl-CoA 6-desaturase, delta-6-desaturase

Databases
- IntEnz: IntEnz view
- BRENDA: BRENDA entry
- ExPASy: NiceZyme view
- KEGG: KEGG entry
- MetaCyc: metabolic pathway
- PRIAM: profile
- PDB structures: RCSB PDB PDBe PDBsum
- Gene Ontology: AmiGO / QuickGO
Search
- PMC: articles
- PubMed: articles
- NCBI: proteins

Linoleoyl-CoA desaturase (also Delta 6 desaturase, EC 1.14.19.3) is an enzyme that converts between types of fatty acids, which are essential nutrients in the human body. The enzyme mainly catalyzes the chemical reaction

linoleoyl-CoA + AH_{2} + O_{2} $\rightleftharpoons$ gamma-linolenoyl-CoA + A + 2 H_{2}O

The three substrates of this enzyme are linoleoyl-CoA, an electron acceptor AH_{2}, and O_{2}, whereas its three products are gamma-linolenoyl-CoA, the reduction product A, and H_{2}O.

This enzyme belongs to the family of oxidoreductases, specifically those acting on paired donors, with O_{2} as oxidant and incorporation or reduction of oxygen. The oxygen incorporated need not be derived from O_{2} with oxidation of a pair of donors resulting in the reduction of O to two molecules of water. The systematic name of this enzyme class is linoleoyl-CoA,hydrogen-donor:oxygen oxidoreductase. Other names in common use include acyl-CoA 6-desaturase, Delta6-desaturase (D6D or Δ-6-desaturase), Delta6-fatty acyl-CoA desaturase, Delta6-acyl CoA desaturase, fatty acid Delta6-desaturase, fatty acid 6-desaturase, linoleate desaturase, linoleic desaturase, linoleic acid desaturase, linoleoyl CoA desaturase, linoleoyl-coenzyme A desaturase, and long-chain fatty acid Delta6-desaturase. This enzyme participates in linoleic acid metabolism. It employs one cofactor, iron.

The enzyme is molecularly identical across all living things. It is present in animals, plants, fungi, and cyanobacteria.

D6D is one of the three fatty acid desaturases present in humans along with Δ-5 and Δ-9, named so because it was thought to desaturate bond between carbons 6 and 7, counting from carboxyl group (with the carboxyl group carbon numbered one). The number 6 in the name of the enzyme has nothing to do with omega-6 fatty acids. In humans, D6D is encoded by the FADS2 gene.

== Function ==
D6D is a desaturase enzyme, i.e. it introduces a double bond in a specific position of long-chain fatty acids. D6D is necessary to synthesize longer chain omega-3 and omega-6 fatty acids. In humans, it is used principally for the conversions of cis-linoleic acid to gamma-linolenic acid (GLA), and palmitic acid to sapienic acid. It also converts alpha-linolenic acid (ALA) to stearidonic acid and tetracosatetraenoic acid to tetracosapentaenoic acid, intermediate steps in the synthesis of ALA to EPA and of EPA to DHA, respectively.

== Toxoplasma gondii ==
Felines lack D6D activity in their guts and accumulate systemic linoleic acid. This increase in linoleic acid in cats has an influence in causing the sexual cycle of Toxoplasma gondii to be restricted to felines, with linoleic acid stimulating T. gondii sexual reproduction.
