= Fatty acid desaturase =

Fatty acid desaturase, type 1

Identifiers
- Symbol: Fatty_acid_desaturase-1
- Pfam: PF00487
- InterPro: IPR005804
- OPM superfamily: 431
- OPM protein: 4zyo
Available protein structures:
- PDB: IPR005804 PF00487 (ECOD; PDBsum)
- AlphaFold: IPR005804; PF00487

Fatty acid desaturase, type 2

Identifiers
- Symbol: Fatty_acid_desaturase-2
- Pfam: PF03405
- InterPro: IPR005067
Available protein structures:
- PDB: IPR005067 PF03405 (ECOD; PDBsum)
- AlphaFold: IPR005067; PF03405

Fatty acid desaturases (also called unsaturases) are a family of enzymes that convert saturated fatty acids into unsaturated fatty acids and polyunsaturated fatty acids. For the common fatty acids of the C18 variety, desaturases convert stearic acid into oleic acid. Other desaturases convert oleic acid into linoleic acid, which is the precursor to alpha-linolenic acid, gamma-linolenic acid, and eicosatrienoic acid.

Two nomenclatures are used to indicate the position of desaturation:

- Delta - indicating that the double bond is created at a fixed position from the carboxyl end of a fatty acid chain. For example, Δ9-desaturase creates a double bond between the ninth and tenth carbon atom from the carboxyl end.
- Omega - indicating the double bond is created at a fixed position from the methyl end of a fatty acid chain. For instance, ω3 desaturase creates a double bond between the third and fourth carbon atom from the methyl end. In other words, it creates an omega-3 fatty acid.

For example, Δ6 desaturation introduces a double bond between carbons 6 and 7 of linoleic acid (LA C_{18}H_{32}O_{2}; 18:2-n6) and α-linolenic acid (ALA: C_{18}H_{30}O_{2}; 18:3-n3), creating γ-linolenic acid (GLA: C_{18}H_{30}O_{2},18:3-n6) and stearidonic acid (SDA: C_{18}H_{28}O_{2}; 18:4-n3) respectively.

In the biosynthesis of essential fatty acids, an elongase alternates with various desaturases (for example, Δ6-desaturase) to create larger molecules. The elongase extends the molecule by two methylene groups (-CH_{2}-CH_{2}-) while the desaturase forms double bonds.

== Classification ==
Δ-desaturases are represented by two distinct families which do not seem to be evolutionarily related.

Family 1 uses cytochrome b5 as the electron donor. This family includes all animal and fungal fatty acid desaturases, including the human types listed below. This type is also found in plants and bacteria. Desaturases of this family are largely membrane-bound. They process acyl-CoA and acyl-lipid substrates. The Pfam domain (PF00487) also matches the closely related alkane 1-monooxygenases, a reflection of the catalytic flexibility of the FADS-like superfamily. The sphingolipid α-hydroxylases also belong to the same superfamily.

Family 2 uses ferredoxin as the electron donor. This family is found in bacteria and plant plastids. Desaturases of this family are largely soluble and process acyl‐lipid and acyl‐ACP (acyl carrier protein) substrates. Notable examples include:

- Plant stearoyl-(acyl-carrier-protein) 9-desaturase (EC 1.14.19.2), an enzyme that catalyzes the introduction of a double bond at the delta-9 position of steraoyl-ACP to produce oleoyl-ACP. This enzyme is responsible for the conversion of saturated fatty acids to unsaturated fatty acids in the synthesis of vegetable oils. This enzyme is derived from endosymbiosis of the chloroplast.
- Cyanobacterial DesA (EC 1.14.19.45), an enzyme that can introduce a second cis double bond at the delta-12 position of fatty acid bound to membrane glycerolipids. This enzyme is involved in chilling tolerance; the phase transition temperature of lipids of cellular membranes being dependent on the degree of unsaturation of fatty acids of the membrane lipids.

== Mechanism and function ==
Type 1 desaturases have diiron active sites reminiscent of methane monooxygenase. These enzymes are O_{2}-dependent, consistent with their function as either hydroxylation or oxidative dehydrogenation.

All desaturases produce unsaturated fatty acids. Unsaturated fatty acids help maintain structure and function of membranes. Highly unsaturated fatty acids (HUFAs) are incorporated into phospholipids and participate in cell signaling. Unsaturated fatty acids and their derived fats increase the fluidity of membranes.

== Role in human metabolism ==
Fatty acid desaturase appear in all organisms: for example, bacteria, fungus, plants, animals and humans. Four desaturase activities occur in humans: Δ9-desaturase, Δ6-desaturase, Δ5-desaturase, and Δ4-desaturase.

- Δ9-desaturase (EC 1.14.19.1), also known as stearoyl-CoA desaturase-1 (SCD1), is used to synthesize oleic acid, a monounsaturated, ubiquitous component of all cells in the human body, and the major fatty acid in mammalian adipose triglycerides, and also used for phospholipid and cholesteryl ester synthesis. Δ9-desaturase produces oleic acid (C_{18}H_{34}O_{2}; 18:1-n9) by desaturating stearic acid (SA: C_{18}H_{36}O_{2}; 18:0), a saturated fatty acid either synthesized in the body from palmitic acid (PA: C_{16}H_{32}O_{2}; 16:0) or ingested directly.
- Δ6 desaturase ( EC 1.14.19.3) is required for the synthesis of highly unsaturated fatty acids such as eicosapentaenoic and docosahexaenoic acids (synthesized from α-linolenic acid); arachidonic acid and adrenic acid (synthesized from linoleic acid). This is a multi-stage process requiring successive actions by elongase and desaturase enzymes. The gene coding for Δ6 desaturase production has been located on human chromosome 11. The gene responsible is FADS2.
- Δ5 desaturase (EC 1.14.19.44) is required for the synthesis of arachidonic acid. The gene responsible is FADS1 on chromosome 11.
- Δ4 desaturase (EC 1.14.19.-) is required for the synthesis of docosahexaenoic acid. The gene responsible is FADS2 on chromosome 11.

Synthesis of LC-PUFAs in humans and many other eukaryotes starts with:

- Linoleic acid (LA: C_{18}H_{32}O_{2}; 18:2-n6) → Δ6-desaturation → γ-linolenic acid (GLA: C_{18}H_{30}O_{2}; 18:3-n6) → Δ6-specific elongase (introducing two carbons) → dihomo-gamma-linolenic acid DGLA: C_{20}H_{34}O_{2}; 20:3-n6) → Δ5-desaturase → arachidonic acid (AA: C_{20}H_{32}O_{2}; 20:4-n6) → also endocannabinoids.
- α-Linolenic acid (ALA: C_{18}H_{30}O_{2}; 18:3-n3) → Δ6-desaturation → stearidonic acid (SDA: C_{18}H_{28}O_{2}; 18:4-n3) and/or → Δ6-specific elongase → eicosatetraenoic acid (ETA: C_{20}H_{32}O_{2}; 20:4-n3) → Δ5-desaturase → eicosapentaenoic acid (EPA: C_{20}H_{30}O_{2}; 20:5-n3).

Vertebrates are unable to synthesize polyunsaturated fatty acids because they do not have the necessary fatty acid desaturases to "convert oleic acid (18:1n-9) into linoleic acid (18:2n-6) and α-linolenic acid (18:3n-3)". Linoleic acid (LA) and α-linolenic acid (ALA) are essential for human health and development, and should therefore be consumed in the diet. Their absence has been found responsible for the development of a wide range of diseases such as metabolic disorders, cardiovascular disorders, inflammatory processes, viral infections, certain types of cancer and autoimmune disorders.

Human fatty acid desaturases include: DEGS1; DEGS2; FADS1; FADS2; FADS3; FADS6; SCD4; SCD5. Not all of these are included in the "canonical" path of fatty acid metabolism above: some of these prefer to work on sphingolipid tails instead of fatty acid-CoA molecules, others are not expressed in the right place to take on a significant part of the work.

=== Endocannabinoid system ===
- Fatty acids with at least 20 carbons (C_{20}) and three double bonds (20:3) bind to CB1 receptors.
- Arachidonic acid (AA) is also the catalyst to the formation of the two main endocannabinoids, anandamide (AEA) and 2-arachidonoylglycerol (2-AG).
  - Anandamide (AEA: C_{22}H_{37}NO_{2}; 20:4,n-6) is an N-acylethanolamine resulting from the formal condensation of the carboxyl group of arachidonic acid (AA: C_{20}H_{32}O_{2}; 20:4-n6) with the amino group of ethanolamine (C_{2}H_{7}NO), bind preferably to CB1 receptors.
  - 2-Arachidonoylglycerol (2-AG: C_{23}H_{38}O_{4}; 20:4-n6) is an endogenous agonist of the cannabinoid receptors (CB1 and CB2), and the physiological ligand for the cannabinoid CB2 receptor. It is an ester formed from omega-6-arachidonic acid (AA: C_{20}H_{32}O_{2}; 20:4-n6) and glycerol (C_{3}H_{8}O_{3}).

== In non-human metabolism ==
The desaturase activities found in non-vertebrate animals, bacteria, and plants provide the essential fatty acids that humans cannot make.

Oleic acid (18:1n-9) is converted into linoleic acid (18:2n-6) by a Δ12 desaturase, and then into α-linolenic acid (18:3n-3) by a Δ15 desaturase.

By a Δ17-desaturase (also not found in humans), gamma-linolenic acid (GLA; 18:3 n-6) can be further converted to stearidonic acid (SDA: C_{18}H_{28}O_{2}; 18:4-n3), dihomo-gamma-linolenic acid (DHGLA/DGLA; 20:3-n6) to eicosatetraenoic acid (ETA; 20:4 n-3; omega-3 arachidonic acid) and arachidonic acid (AA; 20:4 n-6) to eicosapentaenoic acid (EPA; 20:5 n-3), respectively.

=== Industrial relevance ===
The ACP desaturases play a critical role in the biosynthesis of unsaturated fatty acids in plants, and are very specific to their substrates. A common theme in recent research has been to identify uncommon desaturases in various plants and isolate their genetic code. This can then be inserted into model cells (such as Escherichia coli) and up-regulated through metabolic engineering to skew the composition of oils produced by the model cells.

Manipulation of desaturase genes enable or enhance the production of many economically valuable nutraceutical ingredients, such as:

- By copying (mainly CoA) desaturase genes from other organisms into plants, scientists have successfully produced plants that accumulate DHA and EPA in their oils, creating a new source of these nutrients. Some of these oils have received approval for human use while others are approved for animal feed (to increase the nutrition of the meat produced by these animals). This is important because the world does not produce enough of the two fatty acids for consumption by the entire human population at recommended levels.
- Overexpression of a Δ5 desaturase increases EPA production in the diatom Phaeodactylum. This technique can potentially be applied to microalgae, which is currently used to make DHA and EPA.
- Mucor circinelloides, a model organism used in the industry to produce γ-linolenic acid (GLA), can have a D6E(GLELO) gene overexpressed to produce dihomo-γ-linolenic acid (DGLA). Further adding a delta-17 desaturase from another organism makes it able to accumulate eicosatetraenoic acid (20:4 n-3).

== Other desaturating enzymes ==
The following enzymes also "desaturate" substrates but are not conventionally considered desaturases.

=== Acyl-CoA dehydrogenases ===
Acyl-CoA dehydrogenases are enzymes that catalyze formation of a double bond between C2 (α) and C3 (β) of the acyl-CoA thioester substrates. Flavin adenine dinucleotide (FAD) is a required co-factor.

== See also ==
N-acylethanolamine (NAE)
