= Hemp oil =

Oil from hemp seeds

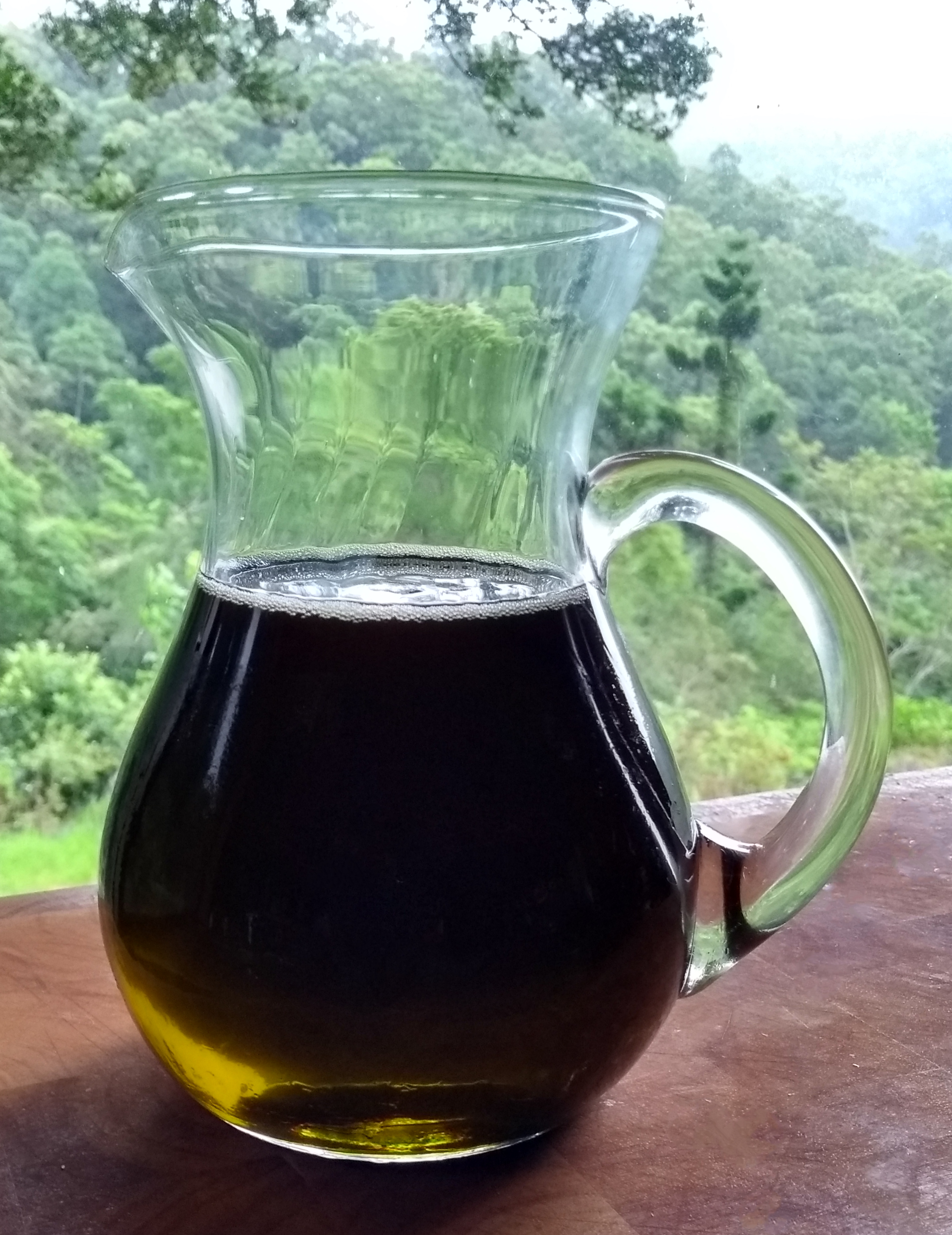
Hemp seed oil

Hemp oil (hemp seed oil) is oil obtained by pressing hemp seeds. Cold pressed, unrefined hemp oil is dark to clear light green in color, with a nutty flavor. The darker the color, the grassier the flavour. It should not be confused with hash oil, a psychoactive phytocannabinoid-containing oil made from the Cannabis flower.

== Description ==
Refined hemp seed oil is clear and colorless, with little flavor. It is primarily used in body care products. Industrial hemp seed oil is used in lubricants, paints, inks, fuel, and plastics. Hemp seed oil is used in the production of soaps, shampoos and detergents. The oil has a 3:1 ratio of omega-6 to omega-3 essential fatty acids. It may also be used as a feedstock for the large-scale production of biodiesel.

== Manufacture ==
Hemp seed oil is manufactured from varieties of Cannabis sativa that do not contain significant amounts of tetrahydrocannabinol (THC), the principal psychoactive element present in the cannabis plant. This manufacturing process typically includes cleaning the seed to 99.99% before pressing the oil. There is no THC within the hemp seed, although trace amounts of THC may be found in hemp seed oil when plant matter adheres to the seed surface during manufacturing. The modern production of hemp seed oil, particularly in Canada, has successfully lowered THC values since 1998. Regular accredited sampling of THC in Canadian hemp seed oil shows THC levels usually below detection limit of 4 ppm (parts per million, or 4 mg/kg). Legal limit for THC content in foodstuffs in Canada is 10 ppm. In the EU some countries have limits defined such as 5 ppm or "none detected", while other EU countries have no limits defined.

== Nutrition ==
About 49% of the weight of hempseed is an edible oil that contains 76% as polyunsaturated fat, including omega-6 fatty acids such as linoleic acid (LA, 54%) and gamma-linolenic acid (GLA, 3%), and omega-3 fatty acids such as alpha-linolenic acid (ALA, 17%) and stearidonic acid (2%). Both LA and ALA are essential fatty acids. In addition, hempseed oil contains 5% to 11% monounsaturated fat and 5% to 7% saturated fat. In common with other oils and fats, hemp seed oil provides 9 kcal/g.

Compared with other culinary oils, hempseed oil is low in saturated fat and rich in polyunsaturated fat. It has a relatively low smoke point and is not suitable for frying. It is primarily used as a food oil and dietary supplement.

=== Comparison to other vegetable oils ===
Properties of vegetable oils The nutritional values are expressed as percent (%) by mass of total fat.
| Type | Processing treatment | Saturated fatty acids | Monounsaturated fatty acids | | Polyunsaturated fatty acids | | | | Smoke point |
| Type | Processing treatment | Saturated fatty acids | Total | Oleic acid (ω−9) | Total | α-Linolenic acid (ω−3) | Linoleic acid (ω−6) | ω−6:3 ratio | Smoke point |
|---|---|---|---|---|---|---|---|---|---|
| Avocado | | 11.6 | 70.6 | 67.9 | 13.5 | 1 | 12.5 | 12.5:1 | 250 °C (482 °F) |
| Brazil nut | | 17.6 | 26.7 | 26.1 | 55.7 | 0.1 | 55.6 | 457:1 | 208 °C (406 °F) |
| Canola | | 7.4 | 63.3 | 61.8 | 28.1 | 9.1 | 18.6 | 2:1 | 204 °C (400 °F) |
| Coconut | | 82.5 | 6.3 | 6 | 1.7 | 0.019 | 1.68 | 88:1 | 175 °C (347 °F) |
| Corn | | 12.9 | 27.6 | 27.3 | 54.7 | 1 | 58 | 58:1 | 232 °C (450 °F) |
| Cottonseed | | 25.9 | 17.8 | 19 | 51.9 | 1 | 54 | 54:1 | 216 °C (420 °F) |
| Cottonseed | hydrogenated | 93.6 | 1.5 | | 0.6 | 0.2 | 0.3 | 1.5:1 | |
| Flaxseed/linseed | | 9.0 | 18.4 | 18 | 67.8 | 53 | 13 | 0.2:1 | 107 °C (225 °F) |
| Grape seed | | 9.6 | 16.1 | 15.8 | 69.9 | 0.10 | 69.6 | very high | 216 °C (421 °F) |
| Hemp seed | | 7.0 | 9.0 | 9.0 | 82.0 | 22.0 | 54.0 | 2.5:1 | 166 °C (330 °F) |
| High-oleic safflower oil | | 7.5 | 75.2 | 75.2 | 12.8 | 0 | 12.8 | very high | 212 °C (414 °F) |
| Olive (extra virgin) | | 13.8 | 73.0 | 71.3 | 10.5 | 0.7 | 9.8 | 14:1 | 193 °C (380 °F) |
| Palm | | 49.3 | 37.0 | 40 | 9.3 | 0.2 | 9.1 | 45.5:1 | 235 °C (455 °F) |
| Palm | hydrogenated | 88.2 | 5.7 | | 0 | | | | |
| Peanut | | 16.2 | 57.1 | 55.4 | 19.9 | 0.318 | 19.6 | 61.6:1 | 232 °C (450 °F) |
| Rice bran oil | | 25 | 38.4 | 38.4 | 36.6 | 2.2 | 34.4 | 15.6:1 | 232 °C (450 °F) |
| Sesame | | 14.2 | 39.7 | 39.3 | 41.7 | 0.3 | 41.3 | 138:1 | |
| Soybean | | 15.6 | 22.8 | 22.6 | 57.7 | 7 | 51 | 7.3:1 | 238 °C (460 °F) |
| Soybean | partially hydrogenated | 14.9 | 43.0 | 42.5 | 37.6 | 2.6 | 34.9 | 13.4:1 | |
| Sunflower oil | | 8.99 | 63.4 | 62.9 | 20.7 | 0.16 | 20.5 | 128:1 | 227 °C (440 °F) |
| Walnut oil | unrefined | 9.1 | 22.8 | 22.2 | 63.3 | 10.4 | 52.9 | 5:1 | 160 °C (320 °F) |

== Wood finish ==
Hemp oil is a drying oil, as it can polymerize into a solid form. Due to its polymer-forming properties, hemp oil is used on its own or blended with other oils, resins, and solvents as an impregnator and varnish in wood finishing, as a pigment binder in oil paints, and as a plasticizer and hardener in putty.

== Gallery ==
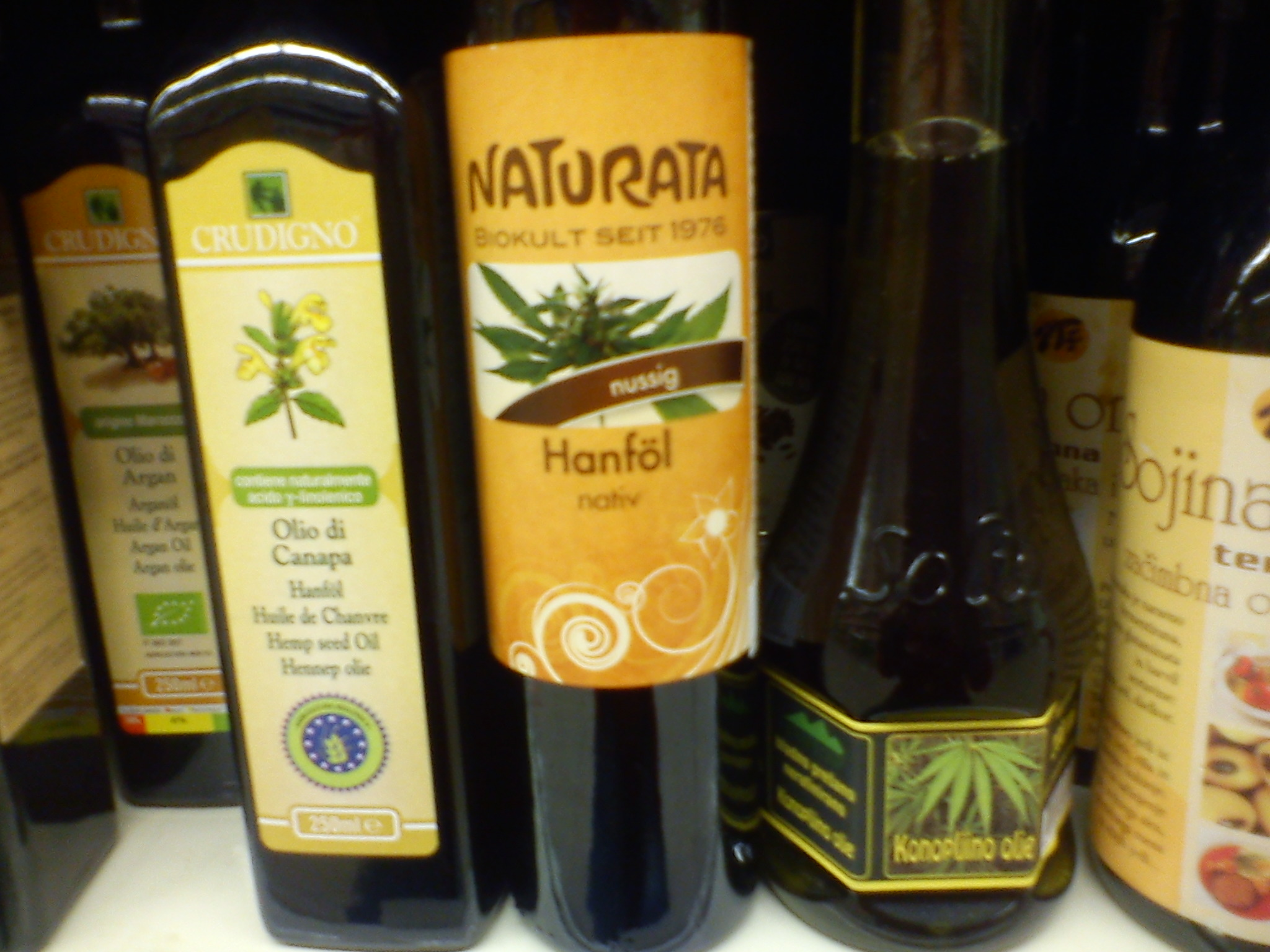
Bottles of hemp seed oil

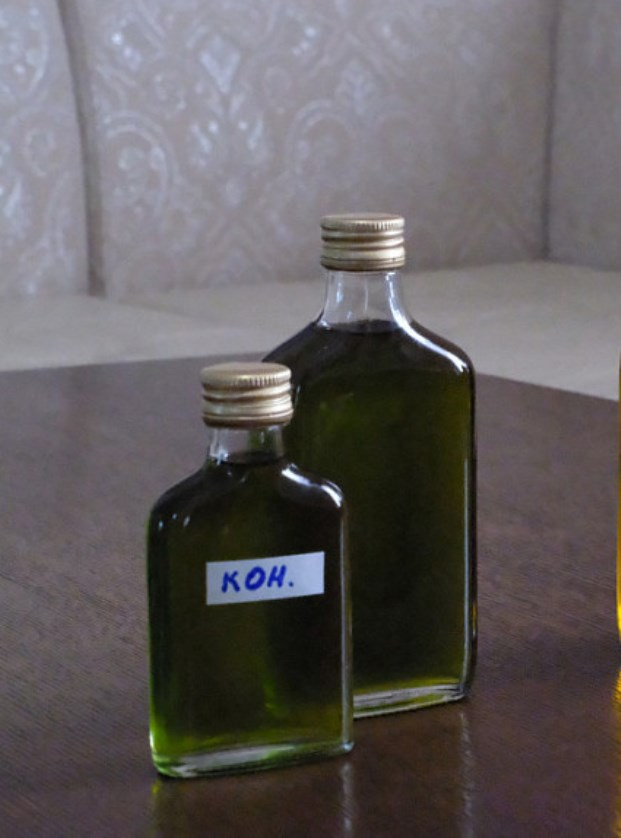
An experimental batch of hemp oil produced in bottles in Buryatia

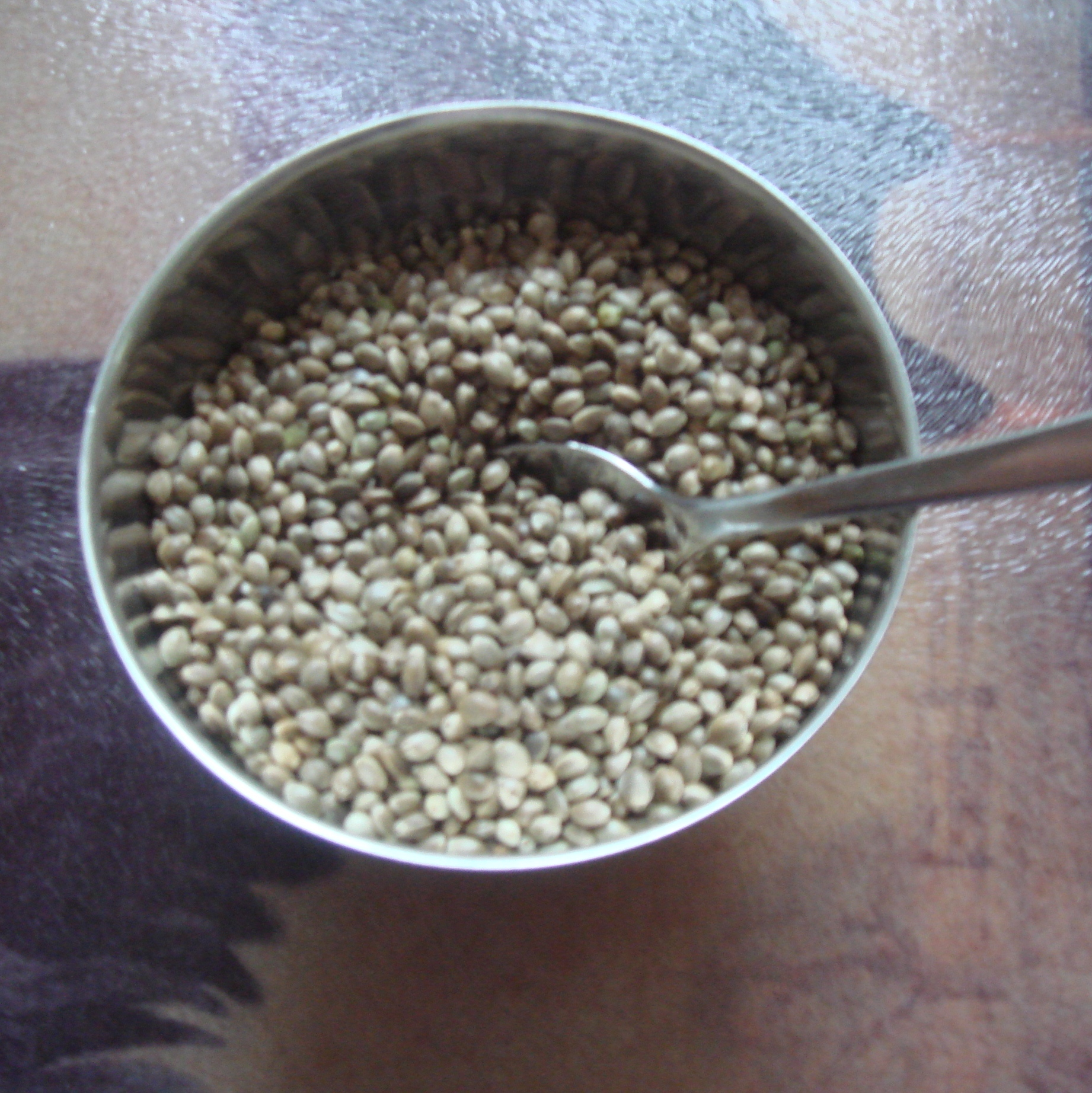
Hemp seeds from which hemp seed oil can be extracted

== Trivia ==
In December 2021, Berlin's public transport offered passengers edible hemp tickets.

== See also ==
- Cannabis (drug)
- Cannabis flower essential oil
- Finola (hemp)
- Hemp plastic
- Vegetable oil
