= Eicosadienoic acid =

20-Carbon polyunsaturated fatty acid

Names
- IUPAC name (11Z,14Z)-icosa-11,14-dienoic acid

Identifiers
| CAS Number | E/Z unspec: 2091-39-6 |
| 3D model (JSmol) | Interactive image |
| ChEBI | CHEBI:73731 |
| ChEMBL | ChEMBL464983 |
| ChemSpider | 9658485 |
| KEGG | C16525 |
| PubChem CID | 6439848 |
| CompTox Dashboard (EPA) | DTXSID20912353 |
- InChI: InChI=1S/C20H36O2/c1-2-3-4-5-6-7-8-9-10-11-12-13-14-15-16-17-18-19-20(21)22/h6-7,9-10H,2-5,8,11-19H2,1H3,(H,21,22)/b7-6-,10-9- Key: XSXIVVZCUAHUJO-HZJYTTRNSA-N
- SMILES: CCCCCC=CCC=CCCCCCCCCCC(=O)O

Properties
| Chemical formula | C_{20}H_{36}O_{2} |
| Molar mass | 308.506 g·mol^{−1} |
| Appearance | colorless liquid |
| Density | 0.9 g/cm³ |
| Melting point | 148.9 °C (300.0 °F; 422.0 K) |
| Boiling point | 198 °C (388 °F; 471 K) |
| Solubility in water | insoluble |

Hazards
| Flash point | 297.4 °C |
- Except where otherwise noted, data are given for materials in their standard state (at 25 °C [77 °F], 100 kPa). Infobox references

Eicosadienoic acid (EDA) is a polyunsaturated omega-6 fatty acid with the chemical formula C_{20}H_{36}O_{2}. It is classified as a 20-carbon fatty acid with two double bonds, specifically at the 11th and 14th positions (denoted as 20:2(ω-6)). EDA is a minor fatty acid found in certain animal and plant sources and plays a role in lipid metabolism.

== Properties ==
Like other polyunsaturated fatty acids (PUFAs), EDA is hydrophobic and insoluble in water but soluble in organic solvents. It is a precursor for longer-chain omega-6 fatty acids, such as dihomo-gamma-linolenic acid (DGLA) and arachidonic acid (AA).

== Isomers ==
Several isomers are common, all with bonds in the cis-configuration. The omega-6 isomer with bonds in the positions 11 and 14, also known as di-homo-linoleic acid, can be detected in modest concentrations, generally not exceeding 2%, in the seed oils of hundreds of plants, particularly Cruciferae, Ranunculaceae, and Pinaceae, as well as in human breast milk.

The omega-9 isomer with bonds in the positions 5 and 11, also known as keteleeronic acid, can be detected in modest concentrations, generally not exceeding 2%, in the seed oils of Pinaceae and Cupressaceae.

Rarer in the plant world are the isomers with bonds in the positions 6 and 9, or 7 and 11, known as di-homotaxoleic acid.
