= Polyunsaturated fat =

Type of fatty acid defined by molecular bonds

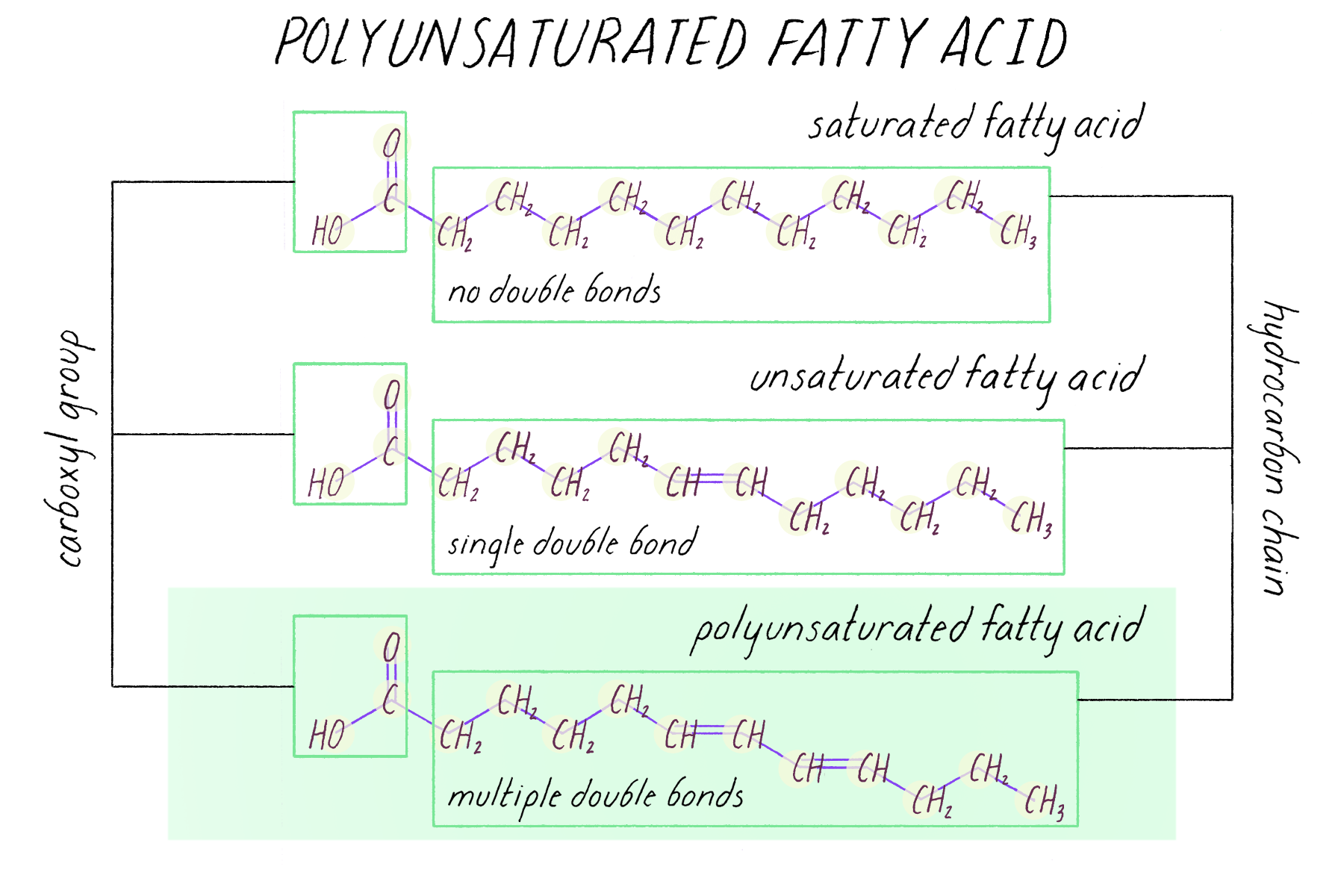
Polyunsaturated: a lipid that has two or more double bonds in its hydrocarbon chain.

In biochemistry and nutrition, a polyunsaturated fat is a fat that contains a polyunsaturated fatty acid (abbreviated PUFA), which is a subclass of fatty acid characterized by a backbone with two or more carbon–carbon double bonds.

Some polyunsaturated fatty acids – alpha-linolenic acid and linoleic acid – are called "essential" because they cannot be synthesized by humans and must be obtained from the diet. Polyunsaturated fatty acids are precursors to and are derived from polyunsaturated fats, which include drying oils.

Chemical structure of the polyunsaturated fatty acid linoleic acid

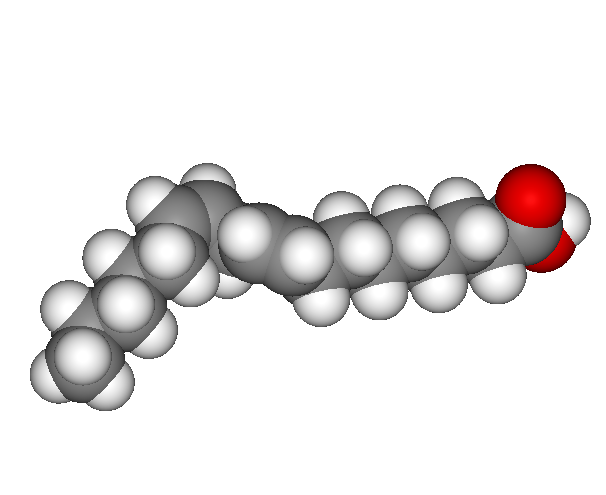
3D representation of linoleic acid in a bent conformation

Chemical structure of α-linolenic acid (ALA), an essential omega−3 fatty acid

== Nomenclature ==
The position of the carbon-carbon double bonds in carboxylic acid chains in fats is designated by Greek letters. The carbon atom closest to the carboxyl group is the alpha carbon, the next carbon is the beta carbon and so on. In fatty acids, the carbon atom of the methyl group at the end of the hydrocarbon chain is called the omega carbon because omega is the last letter of the Greek alphabet. Omega-3 fatty acids have a double bond three carbons away from the methyl carbon, whereas omega-6 fatty acids have a double bond six carbons away from the methyl carbon. The illustration below shows the omega-6 fatty acid, linoleic acid.

Polyunsaturated fatty acids can be classified in various groups by their chemical structure:

- methylene-interrupted polyenes
- conjugated fatty acids
- other PUFAs

Based on the length of their carbon backbone, they are sometimes classified in two groups: All feature pentadiene groups.

- short chain polyunsaturated fatty acids (SC-PUFA), with 18 carbon atoms. These are more common. Key members include linoleic acid and α-linolenic acid]
- long-chain polyunsaturated fatty acids (LC-PUFA) with 20 or more carbon atoms

== Production ==
PUFAs with 18 carbon atoms, which are the most common variety, are not produced by mammals. Since they have important dietary functions, their biosynthesis has received much attention. Plants produce PUFAs from oleic acid. Key enzymes are called fatty acid desaturases, which introduce additional double bonds. Desaturases convert oleic acid into linoleic acid the precursor to alpha-linolenic acid, gamma-linolenic acid and dihomo-gamma-linolenic acid.

Industrial PUFAs are generally obtained by hydrolysis of fats that contain PUFAs. The process is complicated by the sensitive nature of PUFAs, leading to side reactions and colorization. Thus, steam hydrolysis often fails for this reason. Alkaline hydrolysis of fats followed by acidification is expensive. Lipases, a family of enzymes, show potential as mild and green catalysts for the production of PUFAs from triglycerides.

In general, outside of dietary contexts, PUFAs are undesirable components of vegetable oils, so there is great interest in their removal from, say, olive oil. One technology for lowering the PUFA contact is by selective formation of derivatives with ureas.

== Reactions ==
From the perspective of chemical analysis, PUFA's have high iodine numbers. These high values are simply a reflection of the fact that PUFAs are polyunsaturated. Hydrogenation of PUFAs gives less unsaturated derivatives. For unsaturated products from partial hydrogenation often contain some trans isomers. The trans monounsaturated C18 species elaidic acid can be prepared in this way.

=== Peroxidation ===
Polyunsaturated fatty acids are susceptible to lipid peroxidation, far more so than monounsaturated or saturated analogues. The basis for this reactivity is the weakness of doubly allylic C-H bonds. They are drying oils, i.e. film-forming liquids suitable as painting. One practical consequence is that polyunsaturated fatty acids have poor shelf life, owing to their tendency toward autoxidation, leading, in the case of edibles, to rancidification. Metals accelerate the degradation. A range of reactions with oxygen occur. Products include fatty acid hydroperoxides, epoxy-hydroxy polyunsaturated fatty acids, jasmonates, divinylether fatty acids, and leaf aldehydes. Some of these derivatives are signalling molecules, some are used in plant defense (antifeedants), some are precursors to other metabolites that are used by the plant.

== Types ==
=== Methylene-interrupted polyenes ===
These fatty acids have 2 or more cis double bonds that are separated from each other by a single methylene bridge (−CH_{2}−). This form is also sometimes called a divinylmethane pattern.

Methylene- interrupted double bonds
−C−C=C−C−C=C−

The essential fatty acids are all omega-3 and -6 methylene-interrupted fatty acids. See more at Essential fatty acids—Nomenclature

==== Omega-3 ====
Omega-3 fatty acids, polyunsaturated
| Common name | Lipid name | Chemical name |
|---|---|---|
| Hexadecatrienoic acid (HTA) | 16:3 (n-3) | all-cis-7,10,13-hexadecatrienoic acid |
| α-Linolenic acid (ALA) | 18:3 (n-3) | all-cis-9,12,15-octadecatrienoic acid |
| Stearidonic acid (SDA) | 18:4 (n-3) | all-cis-6,9,12,15,-octadecatetraenoic acid |
| Eicosatrienoic acid (ETE) | 20:3 (n-3) | all-cis-11,14,17-eicosatrienoic acid |
| Eicosatetraenoic acid (ETA) | 20:4 (n-3) | all-cis-8,11,14,17-eicosatetraenoic acid |
| Eicosapentaenoic acid (EPA, Timnodonic acid) | 20:5 (n-3) | all-cis-5,8,11,14,17-eicosapentaenoic acid |
| Heneicosapentaenoic acid (HPA) | 21:5 (n-3) | all-cis-6,9,12,15,18-heneicosapentaenoic acid |
| Docosapentaenoic acid (DPA, Clupanodonic acid) | 22:5 (n-3) | all-cis-7,10,13,16,19-docosapentaenoic acid |
| Docosahexaenoic acid (DHA, Cervonic acid) | 22:6 (n-3) | all-cis-4,7,10,13,16,19-docosahexaenoic acid |
| Tetracosapentaenoic acid | 24:5 (n-3) | all-cis-9,12,15,18,21-tetracosapentaenoic acid |
| Tetracosahexaenoic acid (Nisinic acid) | 24:6 (n-3) | all-cis-6,9,12,15,18,21-tetracosahexaenoic acid |

==== Omega-6 ====
Omega-6 fatty acids, polyunsaturated
| Common name | Lipid name | Chemical name |
|---|---|---|
| Linoleic acid (LA) | 18:2 (n-6) | all-cis-9,12-octadecadienoic acid |
| gamma-Linolenic acid (GLA) | 18:3 (n-6) | all-cis-6,9,12-octadecatrienoic acid |
| Eicosadienoic acid | 20:2 (n-6) | all-cis-11,14-eicosadienoic acid |
| Dihomo-gamma-linolenic acid (DGLA) | 20:3 (n-6) | all-cis-8,11,14-eicosatrienoic acid |
| Arachidonic acid (AA) | 20:4 (n-6) | all-cis-5,8,11,14-eicosatetraenoic acid |
| Docosadienoic acid | 22:2 (n-6) | all-cis-13,16-docosadienoic acid |
| Adrenic acid (AdA) | 22:4 (n-6) | all-cis-7,10,13,16-docosatetraenoic acid |
| Docosapentaenoic acid (DPA) | 22:5 (n-6) | all-cis-4,7,10,13,16-docosapentaenoic acid |
| Tetracosatetraenoic acid | 24:4 (n-6) | all-cis-9,12,15,18-tetracosatetraenoic acid |
| Tetracosapentaenoic acid | 24:5 (n-6) | all-cis-6,9,12,15,18-tetracosapentaenoic acid |

=== Conjugated fatty acids ===
Conjugated double bonds
-C=C-C=C-

Conjugated fatty acids have two or more conjugated double bonds
| Common name | Lipid name | Chemical name |
|---|---|---|
Conjugated linoleic acids (two conjugated double bonds)
| Rumenic acid | 18:2 (n-7) | 9Z,11E-octadeca-9,11-dienoic acid |
| | 18:2 (n-6) | 10E,12Z-octadeca-10,12-dienoic acid |
Conjugated Linolenic Acids (three conjugated double bonds)
| α-Calendic acid | 18:3 (n-6) | 8E,10E,12Z-octadecatrienoic acid |
| β-Calendic acid | 18:3 (n-6) | 8E,10E,12E-octadecatrienoic acid |
| Jacaric acid | 18:3 (n-6) | 8Z,10E,12Z-octadecatrienoic acid |
| α-Eleostearic acid | 18:3 (n-5) | 9Z,11E,13E-octadeca-9,11,13-trienoic acid |
| β-Eleostearic acid | 18:3 (n-5) | 9E,11E,13E-octadeca-9,11,13-trienoic acid |
| Catalpic acid | 18:3 (n-5) | 9Z,11Z,13E-octadeca-9,11,13-trienoic acid |
| Punicic acid | 18:3 (n-5) | 9Z,11E,13Z-octadeca-9,11,13-trienoic acid |
Other
| Rumelenic acid | 18:3 (n-3) | 9E,11Z,15E-octadeca-9,11,15-trienoic acid |
| α-Parinaric acid | 18:4 (n-3) | 9E,11Z,13Z,15E-octadeca-9,11,13,15-tetraenoic acid |
| β-Parinaric acid | 18:4 (n-3) | all trans-octadeca-9,11,13,15-tetraenoic acid |
| Bosseopentaenoic acid | 20:5 (n-6) | 5Z,8Z,10E,12E,14Z-eicosapentaenoic acid |

=== Other polyunsaturated fatty acids ===
| Common name | Lipid name | Chemical name |
|---|---|---|
| Pinolenic acid | 18:3 (n-6) | (5Z,9Z,12Z)-octadeca-5,9,12-trienoic acid |
| Sciadonic acid | 20:3 (n-6) | (5Z,11Z,14Z)-eicosa-5,11,14-trienoic acid |

== Health ==
=== Potential benefits ===
Because of their effects in the diet, unsaturated fats (monounsaturated and polyunsaturated) are often referred to as good fats; while saturated fats are sometimes referred to as bad fats. Some fat is needed in the diet, but it is usually considered that fats should not be consumed excessively, unsaturated fats should be preferred, and saturated fats in particular should be limited.

A 2018 review of omega-3 supplementation for a year or longer found moderate‐ and high‐quality evidence for little or no effect on mortality or cardiovascular health.

Among omega-3 fatty acids, neither long-chain nor short-chain forms were consistently associated with breast cancer risk. High levels of cosahexaenoic acid, however, the most abundant omega-3 polyunsaturated fatty acid in erythrocyte (red blood cell) membranes, were associated with a reduced risk of breast cancer. Docosahexaenoic acid is vital for the grey matter structure of the human brain, as well as retinal stimulation and neurotransmission.

Contrary to conventional advice, an evaluation of evidence from 1966–1973 pertaining to the health impacts of replacing dietary saturated fat with linoleic acid found that participants in the group doing so had increased rates of death from all causes, coronary heart disease, and cardiovascular disease. Although this evaluation was disputed by many scientists, it fueled debate over worldwide dietary advice to substitute polyunsaturated fats for saturated fats.

=== Pregnancy ===
Polyunsaturated fat supplementation does not decrease the incidence of pregnancy-related disorders, such as hypertension or preeclampsia, but may increase the length of gestation slightly and decreased the incidence of early premature births.

Expert panels in the United States and Europe recommend that pregnant and lactating women consume higher amounts of polyunsaturated fats than the general population to enhance the DHA status of the fetus and newborn.

=== Cancer ===
Results from observational clinical trials on polyunsaturated fat intake and cancer have been inconsistent and vary by numerous factors of cancer incidence, including gender and genetic risk. Some studies have shown associations between higher intakes and/or blood levels of polyunsaturated fat omega-3s and a decreased risk of certain cancers, including breast and colorectal cancer, while other studies found no associations with cancer risk.

== Dietary sources ==
Properties of vegetable oils The nutritional values are expressed as percent (%) by mass of total fat.
| Type | Processing treatment | Saturated fatty acids | Monounsaturated fatty acids | | Polyunsaturated fatty acids | | | | Smoke point |
| Type | Processing treatment | Saturated fatty acids | Total | Oleic acid (ω−9) | Total | α-Linolenic acid (ω−3) | Linoleic acid (ω−6) | ω−6:3 ratio | Smoke point |
|---|---|---|---|---|---|---|---|---|---|
| Avocado | | 11.6 | 70.6 | 67.9 | 13.5 | 1 | 12.5 | 12.5:1 | 250 °C (482 °F) |
| Brazil nut | | 24.8 | 32.7 | 31.3 | 42.0 | 0.1 | 41.9 | 419:1 | 208 °C (406 °F) |
| Canola | | 7.4 | 63.3 | 61.8 | 28.1 | 9.1 | 18.6 | 2:1 | 204 °C (400 °F) |
| Coconut | | 82.5 | 6.3 | 6 | 1.7 | 0.019 | 1.68 | 88:1 | 175 °C (347 °F) |
| Corn | | 12.9 | 27.6 | 27.3 | 54.7 | 1 | 58 | 58:1 | 232 °C (450 °F) |
| Cottonseed | | 25.9 | 17.8 | 19 | 51.9 | 1 | 54 | 54:1 | 216 °C (420 °F) |
| Cottonseed | hydrogenated | 93.6 | 1.5 | | 0.6 | 0.2 | 0.3 | 1.5:1 | |
| Flaxseed/linseed | | 9.0 | 18.4 | 18 | 67.8 | 53 | 13 | 0.2:1 | 107 °C (225 °F) |
| Grape seed | | 9.6 | 16.1 | 15.8 | 69.9 | 0.10 | 69.6 | very high | 216 °C (421 °F) |
| Hemp seed | | 7.0 | 9.0 | 9.0 | 82.0 | 22.0 | 54.0 | 2.5:1 | 166 °C (330 °F) |
| High-oleic safflower oil | | 7.5 | 75.2 | 75.2 | 12.8 | 0 | 12.8 | very high | 212 °C (414 °F) |
| Olive (extra virgin) | | 13.8 | 73.0 | 71.3 | 10.5 | 0.7 | 9.8 | 14:1 | 193 °C (380 °F) |
| Palm | | 49.3 | 37.0 | 40 | 9.3 | 0.2 | 9.1 | 45.5:1 | 235 °C (455 °F) |
| Palm | hydrogenated | 88.2 | 5.7 | | 0 | | | | |
| Peanut | | 16.2 | 57.1 | 55.4 | 19.9 | 0.318 | 19.6 | 61.6:1 | 232 °C (450 °F) |
| Rice bran oil | | 25 | 38.4 | 38.4 | 36.6 | 2.2 | 34.4 | 15.6:1 | 232 °C (450 °F) |
| Sesame | | 14.2 | 39.7 | 39.3 | 41.7 | 0.3 | 41.3 | 138:1 | |
| Soybean | | 15.6 | 22.8 | 22.6 | 57.7 | 7 | 51 | 7.3:1 | 238 °C (460 °F) |
| Soybean | partially hydrogenated | 14.9 | 43.0 | 42.5 | 37.6 | 2.6 | 34.9 | 13.4:1 | |
| Sunflower oil | | 8.99 | 63.4 | 62.9 | 20.7 | 0.16 | 20.5 | 128:1 | 227 °C (440 °F) |
| Walnut oil | unrefined | 9.1 | 22.8 | 22.2 | 63.3 | 10.4 | 52.9 | 5:1 | 160 °C (320 °F) |

Polyunsaturated fat can be found mostly in nuts, seeds, fish, seed oils, and oysters. "Unsaturated" refers to the fact that the molecules contain less than the maximum amount of hydrogen (if there were no double bonds). These materials exist as cis or trans isomers depending on the geometry of the double bond.

Fat composition as weight percentage of total fat
| Food | Saturated (%) | Mono- unsaturated (%) | Poly- unsaturated (%) |
Cooking oils
| Algal oil | 4 | 92 | 4 |
| Canola | 8 | 64 | 28 |
| Coconut oil | 87 | 13 | 0 |
| Corn oil | 13 | 24 | 59 |
| Cottonseed oil | 27 | 19 | 54 |
| Olive oil | 14 | 73 | 11 |
| Palm kernel oil | 86 | 12 | 2 |
| Palm oil | 51 | 39 | 10 |
| Peanut oil | 17 | 46 | 32 |
| Rice bran oil | 25 | 38 | 37 |
| Safflower oil, high oleic | 6 | 75 | 14 |
| Safflower oil, linoleic | 6 | 14 | 75 |
| Soybean oil | 15 | 24 | 58 |
| Sunflower oil | 11 | 20 | 69 |
| Mustard oil | 11 | 59 | 21 |
Dairy products
| Butterfat | 66 | 30 | 4 |
| Cheese, regular | 64 | 29 | 3 |
| Cheese, light | 60 | 30 | 0 |
| Ice cream, gourmet | 62 | 29 | 4 |
| Ice cream, light | 62 | 29 | 4 |
| Milk, whole | 62 | 28 | 4 |
| Milk, 2% | 62 | 30 | 0 |
| Whipping cream* | 66 | 26 | 5 |
Meats
| Beef | 33 | 38 | 5 |
| Ground sirloin | 38 | 44 | 4 |
| Pork chop | 35 | 44 | 8 |
| Ham | 35 | 49 | 16 |
| Chicken breast | 29 | 34 | 21 |
| Chicken | 34 | 23 | 30 |
| Turkey breast | 30 | 20 | 30 |
| Turkey drumstick | 32 | 22 | 30 |
| Fish, orange roughy | 23 | 15 | 46 |
| Salmon | 28 | 33 | 28 |
| Hot dog, beef | 42 | 48 | 5 |
| Hot dog, turkey | 28 | 40 | 22 |
| Burger, fast food | 36 | 44 | 6 |
| Cheeseburger, fast food | 43 | 40 | 7 |
| Breaded chicken sandwich | 20 | 39 | 32 |
| Grilled chicken sandwich | 26 | 42 | 20 |
| Sausage, Polish | 37 | 46 | 11 |
| Sausage, turkey | 28 | 40 | 22 |
| Pizza, sausage | 41 | 32 | 20 |
| Pizza, cheese | 60 | 28 | 5 |
Nuts
| Almonds dry roasted | 9 | 65 | 21 |
| Cashews dry roasted | 20 | 59 | 17 |
| Macadamia dry roasted | 15 | 79 | 2 |
| Peanut dry roasted | 14 | 50 | 31 |
| Pecans dry roasted | 8 | 62 | 25 |
| Flaxseeds, ground | 8 | 23 | 65 |
| Sesame seeds | 14 | 38 | 44 |
| Soybeans | 14 | 22 | 57 |
| Sunflower seeds | 11 | 19 | 66 |
| Walnuts dry roasted | 9 | 23 | 63 |
Sweets and baked goods
| Candy, chocolate bar | 59 | 33 | 3 |
| Candy, fruit chews | 14 | 44 | 38 |
| Cookie, oatmeal raisin | 22 | 47 | 27 |
| Cookie, chocolate chip | 35 | 42 | 18 |
| Cake, yellow | 60 | 25 | 10 |
| Pastry, Danish | 50 | 31 | 14 |
Fats added during cooking or at the table
| Butter, stick | 63 | 29 | 3 |
| Butter, whipped | 62 | 29 | 4 |
| Margarine, stick | 18 | 39 | 39 |
| Margarine, tub | 16 | 33 | 49 |
| Margarine, light tub | 19 | 46 | 33 |
| Lard | 39 | 45 | 11 |
| Shortening | 25 | 45 | 26 |
| Chicken fat | 30 | 45 | 21 |
| Beef fat | 41 | 43 | 3 |
| Goose fat | 33 | 55 | 11 |
| Dressing, blue cheese | 16 | 54 | 25 |
| Dressing, light Italian | 14 | 24 | 58 |
Other
| Egg yolk fat | 36 | 44 | 16 |
| Avocado | 16 | 71 | 13 |
Unless else specified in boxes, then reference is:
* 3% is trans fats

== Non-dietary applications ==
PUFA's are significant components of alkyd resins, which are used in coatings.
