= MSMO1 =

Protein-coding gene in the species Homo sapiens

Identifiers
- Aliases: MSMO1, DESP4, ERG25, SC4MOL, MCCPD, methylsterol monooxygenase 1
- External IDs: OMIM: 607545; MGI: 1913484; GeneCards: MSMO1
Enzyme activity
| EC # | BRENDA | ExPASy | KEGG | MetaCyc |
|---|---|---|---|---|
| 1.14.18.9 | ↗ | ↗ | ↗ | ↗ |

Gene location (Human)
| Chr. | Chromosome 4 (human) |
| Band | 4q32.3 | Start | 165,327,667 bp |
| Band | 4q32.3 | End | 165,343,164 bp |

Gene location (Mouse)
| Chr. | Chromosome 8 (mouse) |
| Band | 8|8 B3.1 | Start | 65,171,173 bp |
| Band | 8|8 B3.1 | End | 65,186,826 bp |
RNA expression pattern
| Bgee | Human / Mouse (ortholog); Top expressed in: skin of thigh; vulva; retinal pigment epithelium; ganglionic eminence; ventricular zone; bronchial epithelial cell; jejunal mucosa; optic nerve; liver; right lobe of liver / Top expressed in: skin of external ear; sciatic nerve; lip; ventral tegmental area; transitional epithelium of urinary bladder; dorsal tegmental nucleus; medial vestibular nucleus; left lobe of liver; migratory enteric neural crest cell; cumulus cell; More reference expression data |
| BioGPS | n/a |
Gene ontology
| Molecular function | iron ion binding; oxidoreductase activity; C-4 methylsterol oxidase activity |
| Cellular component | integral component of membrane; plasma membrane; endoplasmic reticulum; membrane; endoplasmic reticulum membrane |
| Biological process | cholesterol biosynthetic process; steroid metabolic process; fatty acid metabolic process; lipid metabolism; steroid biosynthetic process; sterol biosynthetic process; lipid biosynthetic process |
Sources:Amigo / QuickGO
Orthologs
| Databases | NCBI: entry; OMA: entry |
| Species | Human | Mouse |
| Entrez | 6307 | 66234 |
| Ensembl | ENSG00000052802 | ENSMUSG00000031604 |
| UniProt | Q15800 | Q9CRA4 |
| RefSeq (mRNA) | NM_001017369; NM_006745 | NM_025436 |
| RefSeq (protein) | NP_001017369; NP_006736 | NP_079712 |
| Location (UCSC) | Chr 4: 165.33 – 165.34 Mb | Chr 8: 65.17 – 65.19 Mb |
| PubMed search |
- Wikidata
| View/Edit Human | View/Edit Mouse |

Methylsterol monooxygenase 1 is a protein that in humans is encoded by the MSMO1 gene.

== Function ==
Sterol-C4-methyl oxidase-like protein was isolated based on its similarity to the yeast ERG25 protein. It contains a set of putative metal binding motifs with similarity to that seen in a family of membrane desaturases-hydroxylases. The protein is localized to the endoplasmic reticulum membrane and is believed to function in cholesterol biosynthesis. Alternatively spliced transcript variants encoding distinct isoforms have been found for this gene.
