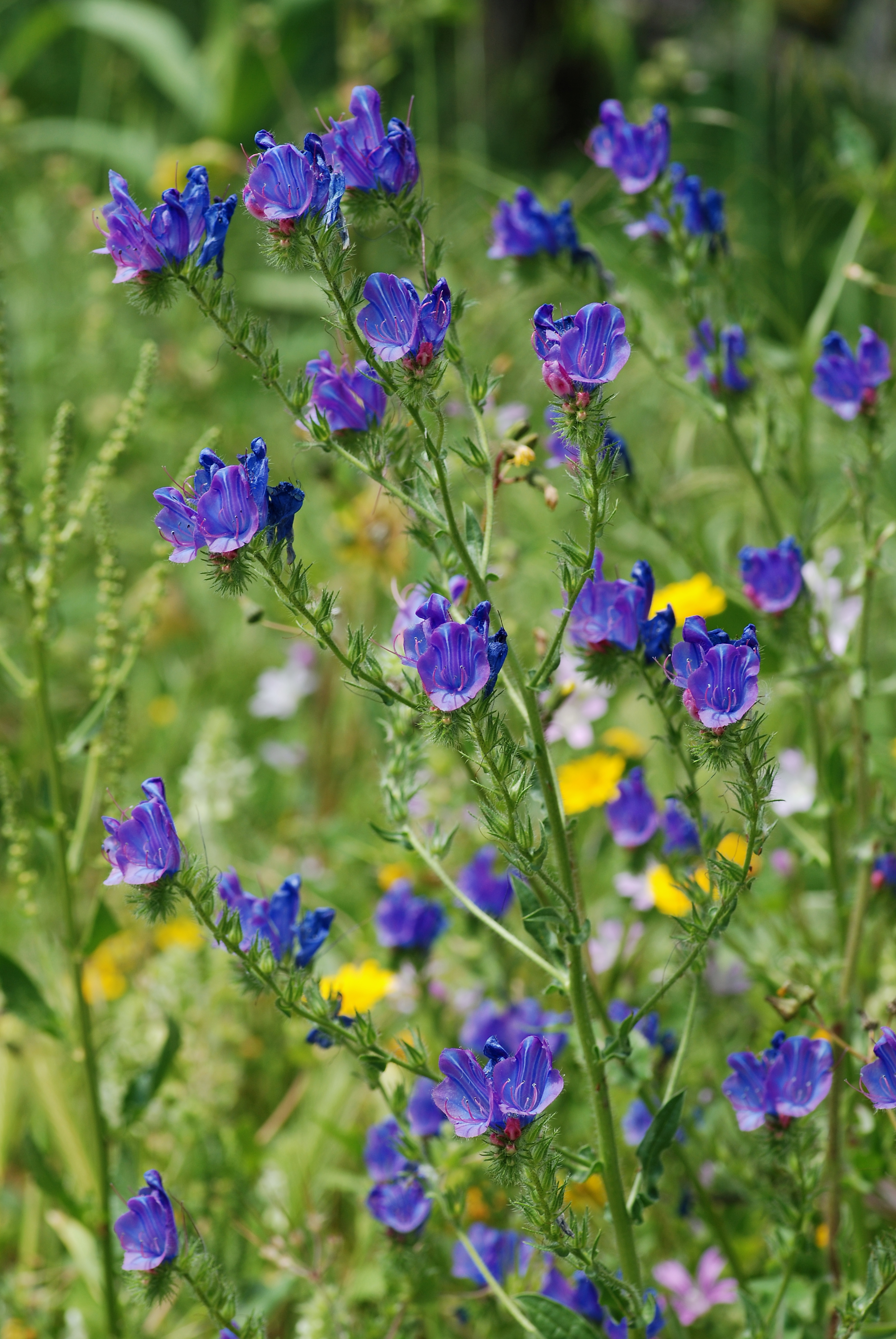
- In Portugal

Scientific classification
- Kingdom: Plantae
- Clade: Tracheophytes
- Clade: Angiosperms
- Clade: Eudicots
- Clade: Asterids
- Order: Boraginales
- Family: Boraginaceae
- Genus: Echium
- Species: E. plantagineum

Binomial name
- Echium plantagineum L.

= Echium plantagineum =

Species of plant

Echium plantagineum, commonly known as purple viper's-bugloss, Paterson's curse or Salvation Jane, is a species of the genus Echium native to western and southern Europe (from southern England south to Iberia and east to the Crimea), northern Africa, and southwestern Asia (east to Georgia). It has also been introduced to Australia, South Africa, and United States, where it is an invasive weed. Due to a high concentration of pyrrolizidine alkaloids, it is poisonous to grazing livestock, especially those with simple digestive systems, such as horses.

== Description ==
Echium plantagineum is a winter annual plant growing to 20–60 cm tall, with rough, hairy, lanceolate leaves up to 14 cm long. The flowers are purple, 15–20 mm long, with all the stamens protruding, and borne on a branched spike.

== Taxonomy ==
The Latin genus name comes from the Greek word ekhis, which means viper (a type of snake), possibly due to the seeds resembling a viper's head or the forking at the end of the thin flower style resembles a viper's tongue. The plant's roots, when eaten with wine, are claimed to provide a folk cure for a snakebite. The Latin specific epithet plantagineum refers to the leaves of the plant, which are similar to those of a plantain.

== Echium seed oil ==
The seed oil from E. plantagineum contains high levels of alpha-linolenic acid (ALA), gamma-linolenic acid, and stearidonic acid, making it valuable in cosmetic and skin-care applications, with further potential as a functional food, as an alternative to fish oils. However, despite its high ALA content, Echium seed oil does not increase docosahexaenoic acid and eicosapentaenoic acid levels.

== Invasive species ==
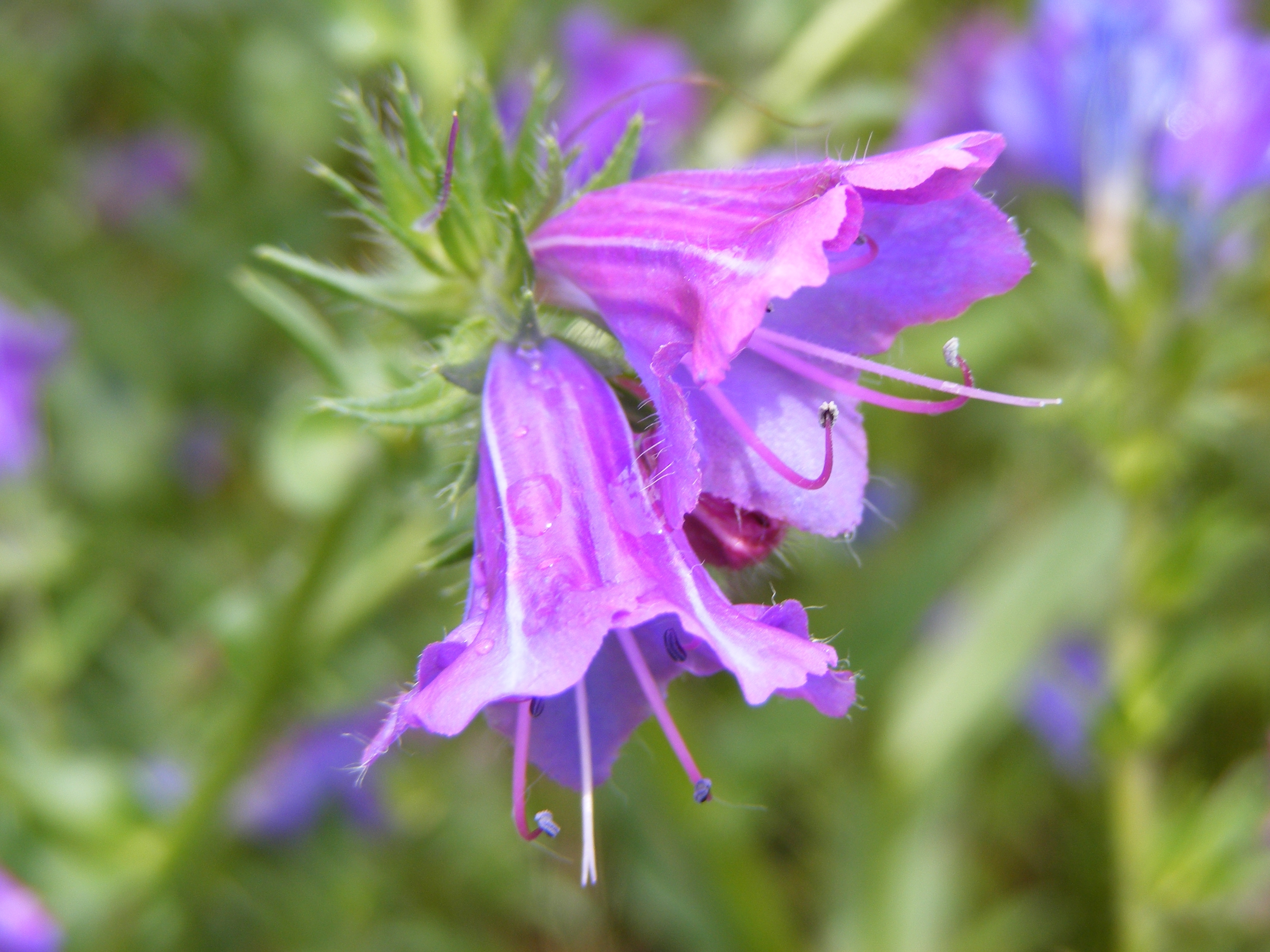
In Adelaide, South Australia

E. plantagineum has become an invasive species in Australia, where it is also known as Salvation Jane (particularly in South Australia), blueweed, Lady Campbell weed, Paterson's curse and Riverina bluebell.

In the United States, the species has become naturalised in parts of California, Oregon, and some eastern states and areas such as northern Michigan. In Oregon, it has been declared a noxious weed.

== Toxicity ==
E. plantagineum – commonly called Paterson's curse or pyrrolizidinosis in veterinary medicine – contains pyrrolizidine alkaloids, which is poisonous to grazing animals, especially nonruminants. When eaten in large quantities, it causes reduced livestock weight, and death in severe cases, due to liver damage. Paterson's curse can kill horses, and irritate the udders of dairy cows and the skin of humans.

After the 2003 Canberra bushfires, a large bloom of the plant occurred on the burned land, and many horses became ill and died from grazing on it. Because the alkaloids can also be found in the nectar of Paterson's curse, the honey made from it should be blended with other honeys to dilute the toxins.
