= Neurofuran =

Essential fatty acid metabolite used as potential indicator for oxidative stress

Chemical structure of an example neurofuran derived from the fatty acid docosahexaenoic acid (DHA)

Neurofurans are 22-carbon compounds formed nonenzymatically by free radical mediated peroxidation of docosahexaenoic acid (DHA), an ω-3 essential fatty acid. The neurofurans are similar to the isofurans and are formed under similar conditions of oxidative stress, containing a substituted tetrahydrofuran ring. Measurement of the neurofurans may ultimately prove useful in diagnosis, timing, and selection of dosages in the treatment and chemoprevention of neurodegenerative disease.
