= Eicosatetraenoic acid =

20-Carbon polyunsaturated fatty acid

Eicosatetraenoic acid (ETA, 20:4) designates any straight chain tetra-unsaturated 20-carbon fatty acid. These compound are classified as polyunsaturated fatty acids (PUFA). The pure compounds, which are encountered rarely, are colorless oils. Two isomers, both of them as fatty acids, are of particular interest:

- all-cis-5,8,11,14-eicosatetraenoic acid (20:4 ω-6) is an ω-6 fatty acid with the trivial name arachidonic acid. It is formed by a desaturation of dihomo-gamma-linolenic acid (DGLA, 20:3 ω-6).
- all-cis-8,11,14,17-eicosatetraenoic acid (20:4 ω-3) is an ω-3 fatty acid. It is an intermediate between stearidonic acid (18:4 ω-3) and eicosapentaenoic acid (EPA, 20:5 ω-3)

Some chemistry sources define 'arachadonic acid' to designate any of the eicosatetraenoic acids. However, almost all writings in biology, medicine, and nutrition limit the use of the term 'arachidonic acid' to all-cis-5,8,11,14-eicosatetraenoic acid (ω-6).

== Precursors to eicosanoids ==
Eicosanoids, a diverse family of signaling molecules, are produced by oxygenation of polyunsaturated eicosatetraenoic acids. The eicosanoids, working in tandem, contribute to a lipid signaling complex widely responsible for inducing an inflammatory immune response. Common signs of inflammation are both internal and external, with effects like visible redness, pain in the surrounding area, swelling, and the sensation of heat—many of these an effect of varying eicosanoid species. These effects are associated with and have been observed in patients with cancers and various neurological/metabolic disorders.

== Related studies ==
ETA is found in green-lipped mussel and appears to inhibit the oxygenation of arachidonic acid by both the cyclooxygenase (COX) and lipoxygenase pathways.

Mutant of Mortierella alpina 1S-4 is a fungus employed for producing arachidonic acid. These mutants produce larger amounts of ETA due to the expression of an ω-3-desaturase gene, typically responsible for the significant production of the more abundant PUFAs.

In addition to their inflammatory nature, eicosanoids such as ETA can also contribute to an anti-inflammatory response.

== See also ==
- Juniperonic acid, an isomer
- Polyunsaturated fat
- List of omega-3 fatty acids
- Omega-3 fatty acid
- Omega-6 fatty acid
