= Finola (hemp) =

Variety of flowering plant

'FINOLA'
- Genus: Cannabis
- Species: sativa, subspecies ruderalis
- Cultivar: 'FIN-314'
- Marketing names: 'FINOLA', formerly 'FIN-314'
- Breeder: JC Callaway, Tero Laakkonen
- Origin: University of Kuopio and Palkkila Farm, Finland

'FINOLA' is a low THC hemp variety from Finland that is primarily used to produce hempseed.

It was the first example of an industrial oilseed variety of hemp, recognised by Canada in 1998 and then in the EU by 2003. This variety was primarily developed for the production of hempseed grain, instead of a fiber. 'FINOLA' was the first example of auto flowering Cannabis, and has been the most popular variety grown in Canada since 2005. It has been used extensively for the production of other oilseed hemp varieties, in addition to a long line of auto flowering Cannabis strains.

Initially described by its breeder code as 'FIN-314' in 1995, then registered with plant variety rights in the late 1990s as 'FINOLA', the cultivar resulted from an open pollinated multiplication of two northern Russian accessions from the Vavilov Institute. The developers of the variety speculated that the parent stock may have been Cannabis ruderalis, yet this sub-species designation for Cannabis is not universally recognised by botanists. 'FINOLA' is short in stature at 1.5 m when mature, making it amenable to machine harvesting. Combine harvesters suitable for grain can also be used to harvest a 'FINOLA' crop without modification.
