= Calendic acid =

18-Carbon polyunsaturated fatty acid

Names
- Preferred IUPAC name (8E,10E,12Z)-Octadeca-8,10,12-trienoic acid
- Other names: α-Calendic acid; (8E,10E,12Z)-Octadecatrienoic acid; trans-8-trans-10-cis-12-Octadecatrienoic acid

Identifiers
CAS Number	5204-87-5
3D model (JSmol)	Interactive image
ChEBI	CHEBI:86148
ChemSpider	4445945
PubChem CID	5282818
UNII	DK8G4N35L5
CompTox Dashboard (EPA)	DTXSID80897455
- InChI: InChI=1S/C18H30O2/c1-2-3-4-5-6-7-8-9-10-11-12-13-14-15-16-17-18(19)20/h6-11H,2-5,12-17H2,1H3,(H,19,20)/b7-6-,9-8+,11-10+ Key: DQGMPXYVZZCNDQ-KBPWROHVSA-N; InChI=1/C18H30O2/c1-2-3-4-5-6-7-8-9-10-11-12-13-14-15-16-17-18(19)20/h6-11H,2-5,12-17H2,1H3,(H,19,20)/b7-6-,9-8+,11-10+ Key: DQGMPXYVZZCNDQ-KBPWROHVBR
- SMILES: O=C(O)CCCCCC\C=C\C=C\C=C/CCCCC

Properties
Chemical formula	C_{18}H_{30}O_{2}
Molar mass	278.436 g·mol^{−1}
- Except where otherwise noted, data are given for materials in their standard state (at 25 °C [77 °F], 100 kPa). verify (what is ?) Infobox references

Calendic acid (sometimes α-calendic acid) is an unsaturated fatty acid, named for the pot marigold (Calendula officinalis), from which it is obtained. It is chemically similar to the conjugated linoleic acids; laboratory work suggests it may have similar in vitro bioactivities.

== Biosynthesis ==
Calendic acid is an omega-6 fatty acid. though not usually listed with this group. Calendic acid is synthesised in Calendula officinalis from linoleate by an unusual Δ12-oleate desaturase (a FAD 2 variant) that converts the cis-double bond at position 9 to a trans,trans-conjugated double bond system. An all-trans beta isomer has been described.

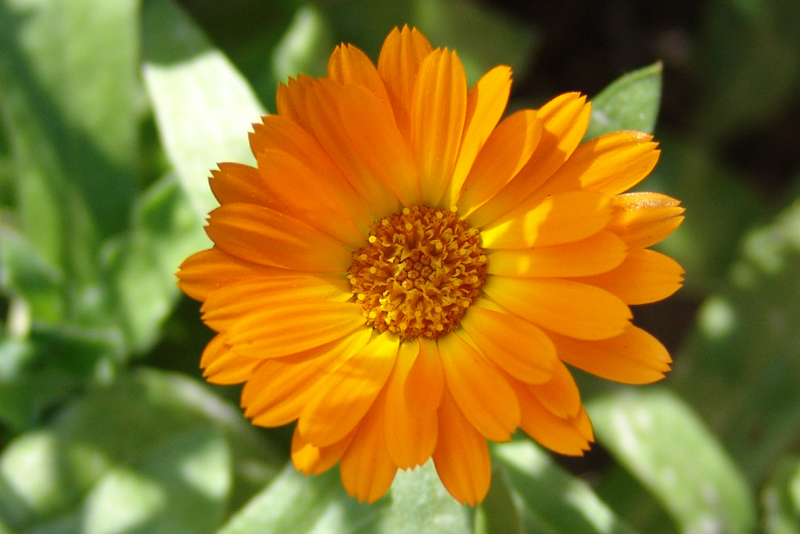
Calendic acid comes from the pot marigold

== Effects ==
Calendic acid is the fatty acid responsible for the reduction in feed intake and improved feed utilization in mice when calendula oil is added to the feedstuff, as demonstrated by the comparative experiments in the examples using corn oil.
