= DEGS2 =

Protein-coding gene in humans

Identifiers
- Aliases: DEGS2, C14orf66, DES2, FADS8, delta(4)-desaturase, sphingolipid 2, delta 4-desaturase, sphingolipid 2
- External IDs: OMIM: 610862; MGI: 1917309; GeneCards: DEGS2
Enzyme activity
EC #	BRENDA	ExPASy	KEGG	MetaCyc
1.14.18.5	↗	↗	↗	↗
1.14.19.17	↗	↗	↗	↗

Gene location (Human)
Chr.	Chromosome 14 (human)
Band	14q32.2	Start	100,143,957 bp
Band	14q32.2	End	100,159,645 bp

Gene location (Mouse)
Chr.	Chromosome 12 (mouse)
Band	12|12 F1	Start	108,644,970 bp
Band	12|12 F1	End	108,668,570 bp
RNA expression pattern
Bgee	Human / Mouse (ortholog); Top expressed in: skin of arm; skin of leg; skin of abdomen; bronchial epithelial cell; olfactory zone of nasal mucosa; mucosa of transverse colon; right hemisphere of cerebellum; nasal epithelium; duodenum; pancreatic ductal cell / Top expressed in: crypt of lieberkuhn of small intestine; pyloric antrum; epithelium of stomach; right kidney; duodenum; Paneth cell; ileum; transitional epithelium of urinary bladder; jejunum; intestinal villus; More reference expression data
BioGPS	n/a
Gene ontology
Molecular function	oxidoreductase activity; sphingosine hydroxylase activity; sphingolipid delta-4 desaturase activity
Cellular component	integral component of membrane; endoplasmic reticulum membrane; endoplasmic reticulum; membrane
Biological process	sphingolipid biosynthetic process; sphinganine metabolic process; lipid metabolism; ceramide biosynthetic process
Sources:Amigo / QuickGO
Orthologs
Databases	NCBI: entry; OMA: entry
Species	Human	Mouse
Entrez	123099	70059
Ensembl	ENSG00000168350	ENSMUSG00000021263
UniProt	Q6QHC5	Q8R2F2
RefSeq (mRNA)	NM_206918	NM_001171002; NM_027299
RefSeq (protein)	NP_996801	NP_001164473; NP_081575
Location (UCSC)	Chr 14: 100.14 – 100.16 Mb	Chr 12: 108.64 – 108.67 Mb
PubMed search
- Wikidata
View/Edit Human	View/Edit Mouse

Delta(4)-desaturase, sphingolipid 2 is a protein that in humans is encoded by the DEGS2 gene.

== Function ==
This gene encodes a bifunctional enzyme that is involved in the biosynthesis of sphingolipids in human skin and in other phytosphingolipid-containing tissues. This enzyme can act as a sphingolipid delta(4)-desaturase, and also as a sphingolipid C4-hydroxylase.
