= FADS1 =

Enzyme found in humans

Identifiers
- Aliases: FADS1, D5D, FADS6, FADSD5, LLCDL1, TU12, fatty acid desaturase 1
- External IDs: OMIM: 606148; MGI: 1923517; GeneCards: FADS1
Enzyme activity
EC #	BRENDA	ExPASy	KEGG	MetaCyc
1.14.19.44	↗	↗	↗	↗

Gene location (Human)
Chr.	Chromosome 11 (human)
Band	11q12.2	Start	61,799,627 bp
Band	11q12.2	End	61,829,318 bp

Gene location (Mouse)
Chr.	Chromosome 19 (mouse)
Band	19|19 A	Start	10,160,252 bp
Band	19|19 A	End	10,174,241 bp
RNA expression pattern
Bgee	Human / Mouse (ortholog); Top expressed in: skin of thigh; ventral tegmental area; superior vestibular nucleus; ventricular zone; spinal ganglia; internal globus pallidus; ganglionic eminence; trigeminal ganglion; inferior ganglion of vagus nerve; subthalamic nucleus / Top expressed in: adrenal gland; tail of embryo; genital tubercle; choroid plexus of fourth ventricle; Epithelium of choroid plexus; left lobe of liver; sciatic nerve; superior frontal gyrus; dentate gyrus of hippocampal formation granule cell; vestibular membrane of cochlear duct; More reference expression data
BioGPS	n/a
Gene ontology
Molecular function	C-5 sterol desaturase activity; oxidoreductase activity; omega-6 fatty acid desaturase activity; acyl-CoA delta5-desaturase activity
Cellular component	integral component of membrane; endoplasmic reticulum membrane; membrane; intracellular membrane-bounded organelle; mitochondrion; endoplasmic reticulum
Biological process	linoleic acid metabolic process; regulation of transcription, DNA-templated; lipid metabolism; cellular response to starvation; cell-cell signaling; alpha-linolenic acid metabolic process; fatty acid metabolic process; icosanoid biosynthetic process; fatty acid biosynthetic process; phospholipid biosynthetic process; unsaturated fatty acid biosynthetic process; regulation of cell differentiation; regulation of lipid metabolic process
Sources:Amigo / QuickGO
Orthologs
Databases	NCBI: entry; OMA: entry
Species	Human	Mouse
Entrez	3992	76267
Ensembl	ENSG00000149485	ENSMUSG00000010663
UniProt	O60427	Q920L1
RefSeq (mRNA)	NM_013402	NM_146094
RefSeq (protein)	NP_037534	NP_666206
Location (UCSC)	Chr 11: 61.8 – 61.83 Mb	Chr 19: 10.16 – 10.17 Mb
PubMed search
- Wikidata
View/Edit Human	View/Edit Mouse

Fatty acid desaturase 1 (FADS1) is an enzyme that in humans is encoded by the FADS1 gene.

== Function ==
The protein encoded by the FADS1 gene is a member of the fatty acid desaturase (FADS) gene family and desaturates omega-3 and omega-6 polyunsaturated fatty acids at the delta-5 position, catalyzing the final step in the formation of eicosapentaenoic acid (EPA) and arachidonic acid. Desaturase enzymes (such as those encoded by FADS1) regulate unsaturation of fatty acids through the introduction of double bonds between defined carbons of the fatty acyl chain. FADS family members are considered fusion products composed of an N-terminal cytochrome b5-like domain and a C-terminal multiple membrane-spanning desaturase portion, both of which are characterized by conserved histidine motifs. This gene is clustered with family members FADS1 and FADS2 at 11q12-q13.1; this cluster is thought to have arisen evolutionarily from gene duplication based on its similar exon/intron organization.

== Clinical significance ==
Single nucleotide polymorphisms (SNPs) of FADS1 and FADS2 may affect long-chain polyunsaturated fatty acids (LC-PUFA) metabolism and have a potential role in the development of atopic diseases.
