= Stearoyl-(acyl-carrier-protein) 9-desaturase =

Class of enzymes

acyl-[acyl-carrier-protein] desaturase
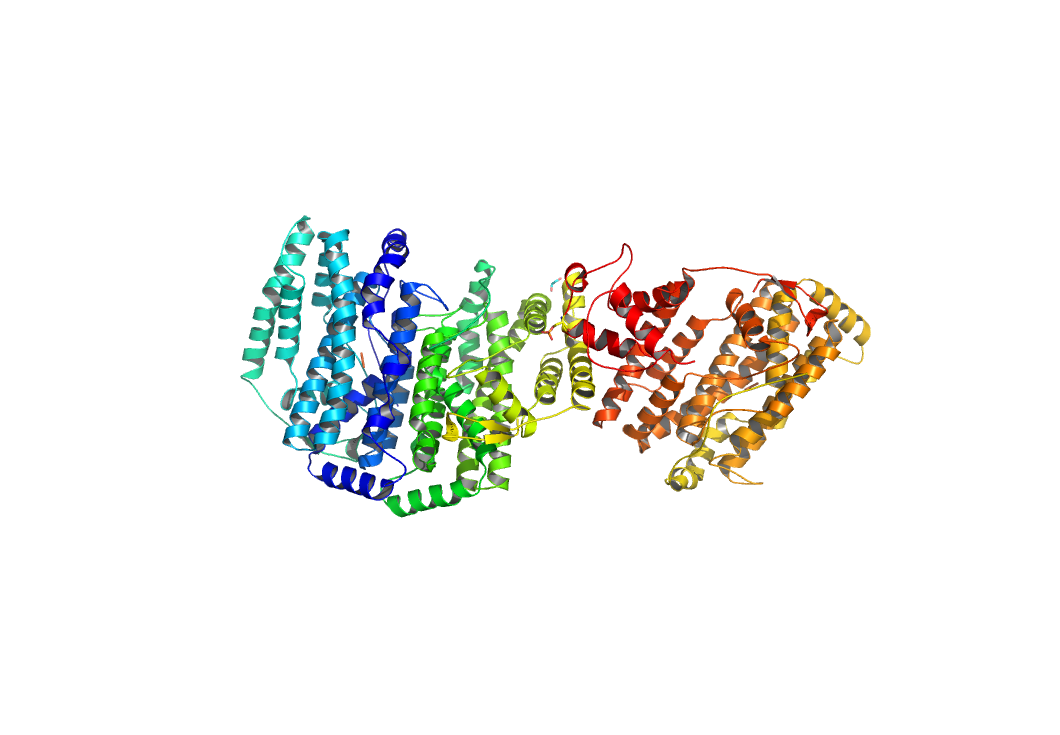
- Partially occupied Stearoyl Acyl Carrier Protein Desaturase from Ricinius Communis

Identifiers
- EC no.: 1.14.19.2
- CAS no.: 37256-86-3

Databases
- IntEnz: IntEnz view
- BRENDA: BRENDA entry
- ExPASy: NiceZyme view
- KEGG: KEGG entry
- MetaCyc: metabolic pathway
- PRIAM: profile
- PDB structures: RCSB PDB PDBe PDBsum
- Gene Ontology: AmiGO / QuickGO
Search
- PMC: articles
- PubMed: articles
- NCBI: proteins

In enzymology, an stearoyl-[acyl-carrier-protein] 9-desaturase (EC 1.14.19.2) is an enzyme that catalyzes the chemical reaction

stearoyl-[acyl-carrier-protein] + reduced acceptor + O_{2} $\rightleftharpoons$ oleoyl-[acyl-carrier-protein] + acceptor + 2 H_{2}O

The systematic name of this enzyme class is stearoyl-[acyl-carrier protein],reduced ferredoxin:oxygen oxidoreductase (9,10 cis-dehydrogenating). Other names in common use include acyl-[acyl-carrier-protein] desaturase (acyl-[acyl-carrier-protein], hydrogen-donor:oxygen oxidoreductase), stearyl acyl carrier protein desaturase, and stearyl-ACP desaturase. This enzyme participates in polyunsaturated fatty acid biosynthesis. It employs one cofactor, ferredoxin.

This protein converts stearoyl (stearic acid) into oleoyl (oleic acid). It is indepensible for the production of oleic acid, a monounsaturated fatty acid, in plants. Oleic acid is then used to make polyunsaturated fatty acids, including those requried for human nutrition. It is water-soluble and found within the thakloid membrane.

== Reaction ==
The 3 substrates of this enzyme are stearoyl-(acyl-carrier-protein), reduced acceptor, and O_{2}, whereas its 3 products are oleoyl-(acyl-carrier-protein), acceptor, and H_{2}O. This enzyme is also able to catalyze an analogous conversion from palmityl-ACP to palmitoleyl-ACP.

The precise mechanism of this class of enzymes is not known, however recent studies using the kinetic isotope effect suggest that the rate limiting step is the removal of a hydrogen from the carbon nearest the carboxylic acid group. The diiron cluster moves through to a peroxo intermediate which can then dehydrate the short-lived alcohol intermediate, liberating water. There are a variety of specific enzymes within this class that attack using this mechanism, but do so at different points along the carbon chain of their respective fatty acids

== Biological function ==
This enzyme belongs to the family of oxidoreductases, specifically those acting on paired donors, with O_{2} as oxidant and incorporation or reduction of oxygen. The oxygen incorporated need not be derived from O_{2} with oxidation of a pair of donors resulting in the formation of H_{2}O.

The acyl-ACP desaturases are found only in the plastids of higher plant cells, unlike other desaturases such as acyl-lipid desaturases and acyl-CoA desaturases. The regiospecific role of stearoyl-ACP desaturase is to initialise multiple desaturations by acyl-lipid desaturases. Oleic acid is formed from this reaction is transported to either the thylakoid or cytoplasm to complete desaturation.

== Structure ==
As of late 2007, 5 structures have been solved for this class of enzymes, with PDB accession codes 1OQ4, 1OQ7, 1OQ9, 1OQB, and 1ZA0.

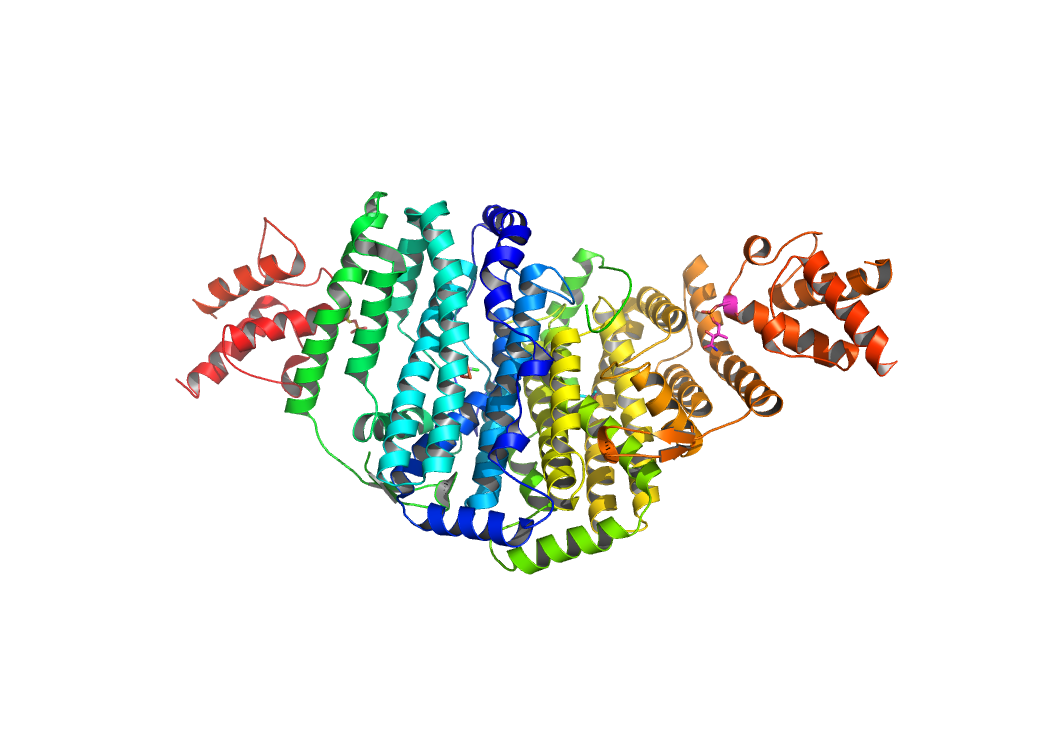
Fully bound Stearoyl-acyl-carrier-protein desaturase PDB 2XZ1.

2XZ0 and 2XZ1 show the dramatic change in conformation of the enzyme when bound (2XZ1) and unbound (2XZ0). As a dimer, the fatty acid chain binds to a hydrophobic pocket at the interface of the two dimers,. This central channel is mirrored by binding sites for the electron donors on either side.

The stabilisation of the diiron-oxo element required to catalyse the reaction has been of particular interest. Crystallographic studies suggest that the iron groups are held in place by the desaturase using aspartate and glutamate. A structure of aspartate-X-X-histidine was found to be a common motif in several plant species. This desaturase family can be further divided by the consensus motif used to hold the iron clusters in place. Of particular note are the "soluble" desaturases, which use carboxylic acid groups, whereas it is possible for some variants to use histidines instead. The histidine rich desaturases tend to be integral membrane proteins.

Structural studies strongly suggest that the animal and fungi forms of this enzyme (stearoyl-CoA 9-desaturase) is evolutionarily divergent from the forms found in plants and fungi. This is to be expected as the roles of the enzymes are different in both, on the most basic level in using CoA instead of an acyl carrier protein.
