= Essential fatty acid =

Fatty acids required for biological processes

Essential fatty acids, or EFAs, are fatty acids that are required by humans and other animals for normal physiological function that cannot be synthesized in the body. As they are not synthesized in the body, the essential fatty acids – alpha-linolenic acid (ALA) and linoleic acid – must be obtained from food or from a dietary supplement. Essential fatty acids are needed for various cellular metabolic processes and for the maintenance and function of tissues and organs. These fatty acids also are precursors to vitamins, cofactors, and derivatives, including prostaglandins, leukotrienes, thromboxanes, lipoxins, and others.

Only two fatty acids are known to be essential for humans: alpha-linolenic acid (an omega−3 fatty acid) and linoleic acid (an omega−6 fatty acid). These are supplied to the body either as the free fatty acid, or more commonly as some glyceride derivative. ALA can be converted into eicosapentaenoic acid and docosahexaenoic acid, but the conversion amount is small, requiring intake from food or supplements. Deficiency in omega−3 fatty acids is very common. The average American has a dietary ratio between omega−6 fatty acids and omega−3 fatty acids of 20:1.

When the two EFAs were discovered in 1923, they were designated "vitamin F", but in 1929, research on rats showed that the two EFAs are better classified as fats rather than vitamins.

== Functions ==
In the body, essential fatty acids serve multiple functions. In each of these, the balance between dietary ω−3 and ω−6 strongly affects function.

- They are modified to make
  - the classic eicosanoids (affecting inflammation and many other cellular functions)
  - the endocannabinoids (affecting mood, behavior and inflammation)
  - the lipoxins which are a group of eicosanoid derivatives formed via the lipoxygenase pathway from ω−6 EFAs and resolvins from ω−3 (in the presence of acetylsalicylic acid, downregulating inflammation)
  - the isofurans, neurofurans, isoprostanes, hepoxilins, epoxyeicosatrienoic acids (EETs) and neuroprotectin D
- They form lipid rafts (affecting cellular signaling)
- They act on DNA (activating or inhibiting transcription factors such as NF-κB, which is linked to pro-inflammatory cytokine production)

== Nomenclature and terminology ==
Fatty acids comprise an aliphatic hydrocarbon chain plus a carboxyl group (–COOH) at one end, and terminated by a methyl group (–CH_{3}) at the other end. They are almost always straight-chained. The carbon next to the carboxylate is known as α, the next carbon β, and so forth. Since biological fatty acids can be of diverse lengths, the last position is often labelled as "ω", the last letter in the Greek alphabet. In the expression ω−x, the minus symbol represents subtraction, indicating how many carbons away from the terminal end (ω) of the chain that the first unsaturated carbon-carbon bond appears. Typically, the number of carbons and the number of double bonds are also listed in short descriptions of unsaturated fatty acids. For instance, ω−3 18:4, or 18:4 ω−3, or 18:4 n−3 indicate stearidonic acid, an 18-carbon chain with 4 double bonds, and with a double bond between the third and fourth carbon atoms from the CH_{3} end. Double bonds are cis (on the same side of the double bond) and separated by a single methylene (CH_{2}) group unless otherwise noted. In free fatty acid form, the chemical structure of stearidonic acid is:

=== Examples ===
Polyunsaturated fatty acids with 16- and 18-carbon chains are sometimes classified as short chain polyunsaturated fatty acids (SC-PUFA), as opposed to long-chain polyunsaturated fatty acids (LC-PUFA), which have more than 18 carbon atoms.

Both the essential fatty acids are SC-PUFA with an 18-carbon chain:

- ω−3 fatty acid:
  - α-linolenic acid or ALA (18:3n−3)
- ω−6 fatty acid:
  - linoleic acid or LA (18:2n−6)

These two fatty acids cannot be synthesized by humans because humans lack the desaturase enzymes required for their production.

They form the starting point for the creation of more desaturated fatty acids, most of which also have a longer carbon chain:

- ω−3 fatty acids:
  - eicosapentaenoic acid or EPA (20:5n−3)
  - docosahexaenoic acid or DHA (22:6n−3)
- ω−6 fatty acids:
  - gamma-linolenic acid or GLA (18:3n−6)
  - dihomo-gamma-linolenic acid or DGLA (20:3n−6)
  - arachidonic acid or AA (20:4n−6)

Except for GLA, which has a short 18-carbon chain, these fatty acids have more than 18 carbon atoms and are typically classified as LC-PUFA.

ω−9 fatty acids are not essential in humans because they can be synthesized from carbohydrates or other fatty acids.

== Essentiality in human diet ==
Mammals lack the ability to introduce double bonds in fatty acids beyond carbon 9 and 10, hence the omega−6 linoleic acid (18:2n−6; LA) and the omega−3 alpha-linolenic acid (18:3n−3; ALA) are essential for humans in the diet. However, humans can convert both LA and ALA to fatty acids with longer carbon chains and a larger number of double bonds, by alternative desaturation and chain elongation.

In humans, arachidonic acid (20:4n−6; AA) can be synthesized from LA. In turn, AA can be converted to an even longer fatty acid, the docosapentaenoic acid (22:5n−6; DPA). Similarly, ALA can be converted to docosahexaenoic acid (22:6n−3; DHA), although the latter conversion is limited, resulting in lower blood levels of DHA than through direct ingestion. This is illustrated by studies in vegans and vegetarians. If there is relatively more LA than ALA in the diet it favors the formation of DPA from LA rather than DHA from ALA. This effect can be altered by changing the relative ratio of LA:ALA, but is more effective when total intake of polyunsaturated fatty acids is low.

In preterm infants, the capacity to convert LA to AA and ALA to DHA is limited, and preformed AA and DHA may be required to meet the needs of the developing brain. Both AA and DHA are present in breastmilk and contribute along with the parent fatty acids LA and ALA to meeting the requirements of the newborn infant. Many infant formulas have AA and DHA added to them with an aim to make them more equivalent to human milk.

Essential nutrients are defined as those that cannot be synthesized de novo in sufficient quantities for normal physiological function. This definition is met for LA and ALA but not the longer chain derivatives in adults. The longer chain derivatives particularly, however, have pharmacological properties that can modulate disease processes, but this should not be confused with dietary essentiality.

The main physiological requirement for ω−6 fatty acids is attributed to arachidonic acid, which is the major precursor of prostaglandins, leukotrienes that play a vital role in cell signaling, and an endogenous cannabinoid anandamide. Metabolites from the ω−3 pathway, mainly from eicosapentaenoic acid, are mostly inactive.

Reviews by the European Food Safety Authority made recommendations for minimal intakes of LA and ALA and have also recommended intakes of longer chain ω−3 fatty acids based on the association of oily fish consumption with a lower risk of cardiovascular disease.

== Food sources ==
Some of the food sources of ω−3 and ω−6 fatty acids are fish and shellfish, seaweed oil, flaxseed (linseed) and flaxseed oil, hemp seed, olive oil, soya oil, canola (rapeseed) oil, chia seeds, pumpkin seeds, sunflower seeds, leafy vegetables, and walnuts.

Essential fatty acids play a part in many metabolic processes, and there is evidence to suggest that low levels of essential fatty acids, or the wrong balance of types among the essential fatty acids, may be a factor in a number of illnesses, including osteoporosis.

Fish is the main source of the longer omega−3 fats; eicosapentaenoic acid (EPA) and docosahexaenoic acid (DHA), though they initially acquire these fats through the consumption of algae and seaweed. Some plant-based foods contain omega−3 in the form of alpha-linolenic acid (ALA), which appears to have a modest benefit for cardiovascular health. The human body can (and in case of a purely vegetarian diet often must unless certain algae or supplements derived from them are consumed) convert ALA to EPA and subsequently DHA. The conversion of ALA to DHA is sufficient in the adult and additional DHA is not required in the diet. In the infant, the case is less clear; preformed DHA may be required in breastmilk or formula for adequate development, as DHA supplementation in formula was found to improve cognitive development up to one year of age. The effects of DHA supplementation in early childhood after one year are unclear.

== Human health ==
Essential fatty acids play an important role in the life and death of cardiac cells. Additionally, essential fatty acids are crucial for the development of several endocannabinoids with a multitude of functions in the body, such as docosahexaenoyl ethanolamide (DHA-EA/synaptamide).

=== Reference intake values ===
Reference intake values for as published by the Panel on Dietetic Products, Nutrition and Allergies of the European Food Safety Authority (EFSA).

Common name	Type	Reference intake values
alpha-Linolenic acid (ALA)	Omega−3	2 g
Linoleic acid (LA)	Omega−6	10 g

In the United States, the Adequate Intake (AI) for omega−3 fatty acids is for ALA. It is based on the median intake, and for adults the values are 1.6 g/day for men and 1.1 g/day for women. EPA and DHA contribute about 10 percent of total omega−3 intake. The AI for omega−6 fatty acids is for linoleic acid and is also based on the median intake: 17 g/day for younger men, dropping to 14 g/day for men over 50 years old; for younger women 12 g/d, and 11 g/day for women over 50. Studies have shown that smaller intakes reverse the symptoms of deficiency, but there is inadequate information to set an Estimated Average Requirement (EAR) for either.

=== Essential fatty acid deficiency ===
Essential fatty acid deficiency results in a dermatitis similar to that seen in zinc or biotin deficiency.

== See also ==
- Eicosanoid
  - Hydroxyeicosatetraenoic acid
  - Leukotriene
  - Prostaglandin
  - Thromboxane
- Specialized proresolving mediators
- Essential amino acid
- Essential fatty acid interactions
- Fatty acid metabolism
- Fatty acid synthase
- Krill oil
- Nonclassic eicosanoid
- Oily fish
- Omega−3 fatty acid
- Omega−6 fatty acid
- Polyunsaturated fat
