= Nisinic acid =

Names
- Preferred IUPAC name (6Z,9Z,12Z,15Z,18Z,21Z)-Tetracosa-6,9,12,15,18,21-hexaenoic acid
- Other names all-cis-6,9,12,15,18,21-tetracosahexaenoic acid

Identifiers
CAS Number	68378-49-4
3D model (JSmol)	Interactive image
ChemSpider	9967286
PubChem CID	11792612
UNII	L8L6GYZ1ZX
CompTox Dashboard (EPA)	DTXSID801318739
- InChI: InChI=1S/C24H36O2/c1-2-3-4-5-6-7-8-9-10-11-12-13-14-15-16-17-18-19-20-21-22-23-24(25)26/h3-4,6-7,9-10,12-13,15-16,18-19H,2,5,8,11,14,17,20-23H2,1H3,(H,25,26)/b4-3-,7-6-,10-9-,13-12-,16-15-,19-18- Key: YHGJECVSSKXFCJ-KUBAVDMBSA-N
- SMILES: CC/C=C\C/C=C\C/C=C\C/C=C\C/C=C\C/C=C\CCCCC(=O)O

Properties
Chemical formula	C_{24}H_{36}O_{2}
Molar mass	356.550 g·mol^{−1}
- Except where otherwise noted, data are given for materials in their standard state (at 25 °C [77 °F], 100 kPa). Infobox references

Nisinic acid is a very long chain polyunsaturated omega-3 fatty acid, similar to docosahexaenoic acid (DHA). The lipid name is 24:6 (n-3) and the chemical name is all-cis-6,9,12,15,18,21-tetracosahexaenoic acid. It is not well studied, but polyunsaturated fatty acids even longer than DHA, nisinic acid included, may hold scientific promise. It has biological activity and is involved in the formation of DHA, but the mechanisms are still under research.
