= Dihomo-γ-linolenic acid =

20-Carbon polyunsaturated fatty acid

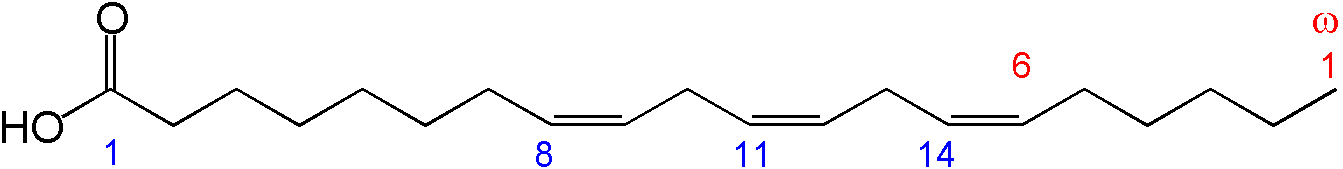
- Dihomo-gamma linolenic acid

Names
- Preferred IUPAC name (8Z,11Z,14Z)-Icosa-8,11,14-trienoic acid
- Other names cis,cis,cis-8,11,14-Eicosatrienoic acid; DGLA; Diroleuton (INN)

Identifiers
CAS Number	1783-84-2
3D model (JSmol)	Interactive image
ChemSpider	4444199
ECHA InfoCard	100.015.667
PubChem CID	5280581
UNII	FC398RK06S
CompTox Dashboard (EPA)	DTXSID00912351
- InChI: InChI=1S/C20H34O2/c1-2-3-4-5-6-7-8-9-10-11-12-13-14-15-16-17-18-19-20(21)22/h6-7,9-10,12-13H,2-5,8,11,14-19H2,1H3,(H,21,22)/b7-6-,10-9-,13-12- Key: HOBAELRKJCKHQD-QNEBEIHSSA-N; InChI=1/C20H34O2/c1-2-3-4-5-6-7-8-9-10-11-12-13-14-15-16-17-18-19-20(21)22/h6-7,9-10,12-13H,2-5,8,11,14-19H2,1H3,(H,21,22)/b7-6-,10-9-,13-12- Key: HOBAELRKJCKHQD-QNEBEIHSBE
- SMILES: CCCCC\C=C/C\C=C/C\C=C/CCCCCCC(=O)O

Properties
Chemical formula	C_{20}H_{34}O_{2}
Molar mass	306.490 g·mol^{−1}
- Except where otherwise noted, data are given for materials in their standard state (at 25 °C [77 °F], 100 kPa). verify (what is ?) Infobox references

Dihomo-γ-linolenic acid (DGLA; 20:3, ω−6) is a 20-carbon ω−6 fatty acid (also called, cis,cis,cis-8,11,14-eicosatrienoic acid). DGLA is a carboxylic acid with a 20-carbon chain and three cis double bonds; the first double bond is located at the sixth carbon from the omega end. DGLA is the elongation product (by ELOVL5) of γ-linolenic acid (GLA; 18:3 ω−6). GLA, in turn, is a desaturation product (by Δ6 desaturase) of linoleic acid (18:2, ω−6). DGLA is made in the body by the elongation of GLA, by an efficient enzyme which does not appear to suffer any form of (dietary) inhibition. DGLA is an extremely uncommon fatty acid, found only in trace amounts in animal products.

== Biological effects ==
The eicosanoid metabolites of DGLA are:

- Series-1 thromboxanes (thromboxanes with 1 double-bond), via the COX-1 and COX-2 pathways.
- Series-1 prostanoids, via the COX-1 and COX-2 pathways.
- A 15-hydroxyl derivative that blocks the transformation of arachidonic acid to leukotrienes.

All of these effects are anti-inflammatory. This is in marked contrast with the analogous metabolites of arachidonic acid (AA), which are the series-2 thromboxanes and prostanoids and the series-4 leukotrienes. In addition to yielding anti-inflammatory eicosanoids, DGLA competes with AA for COX and lipoxygenase, inhibiting the production of AA's eicosanoids. However, DGLA is converted to AA by Δ5 desaturase (FADS1).

FADS1 and ELOVL5 are differently expressed among tissues and cell types. For example, human neutrophils contain ELOVL5 but not FADS1.

=== Supplementation ===
Taken orally in a small study, DGLA produced antithrombotic effects.

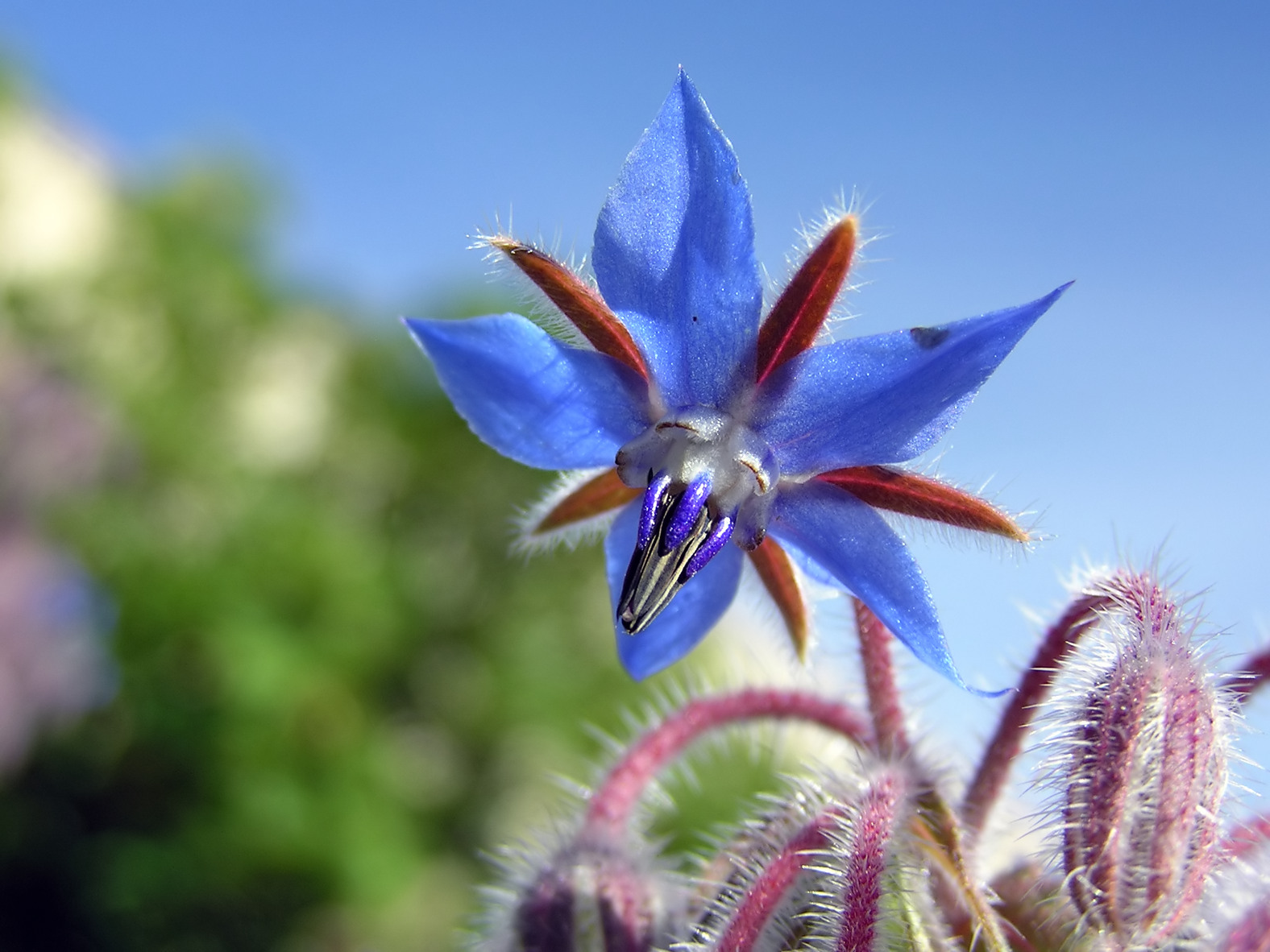
Borage is a rich source of γ-linolenic acid (GLA)—the dietary precursor to DGLA.

Supplementing dietary GLA increases serum DGLA as well as serum AA levels. Cosupplementation of GLA and EPA (20:5 n−3) increases serum DGLA while also decreasing increasing AA levels by blocking Δ5-desaturase activity. Leukotriene synthesis in neutrophils is consequently lowered. Cosupplementation of GLA with botanical n-3 fatty acids also result in improved conversion from GLA to DGLA and reduced conversion from DGLA to AA.

== See also ==
- Essential fatty acid
