= Stearidonic acid =

18-Carbon polyunsaturated fatty acid

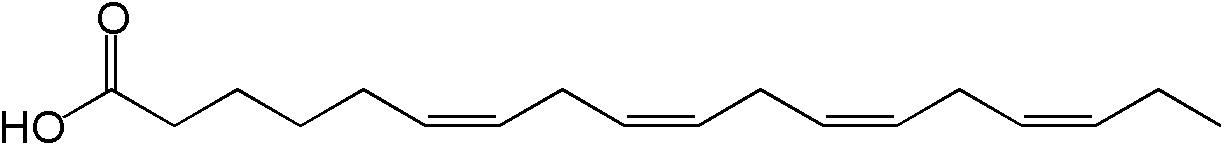
- Stearidonic acid

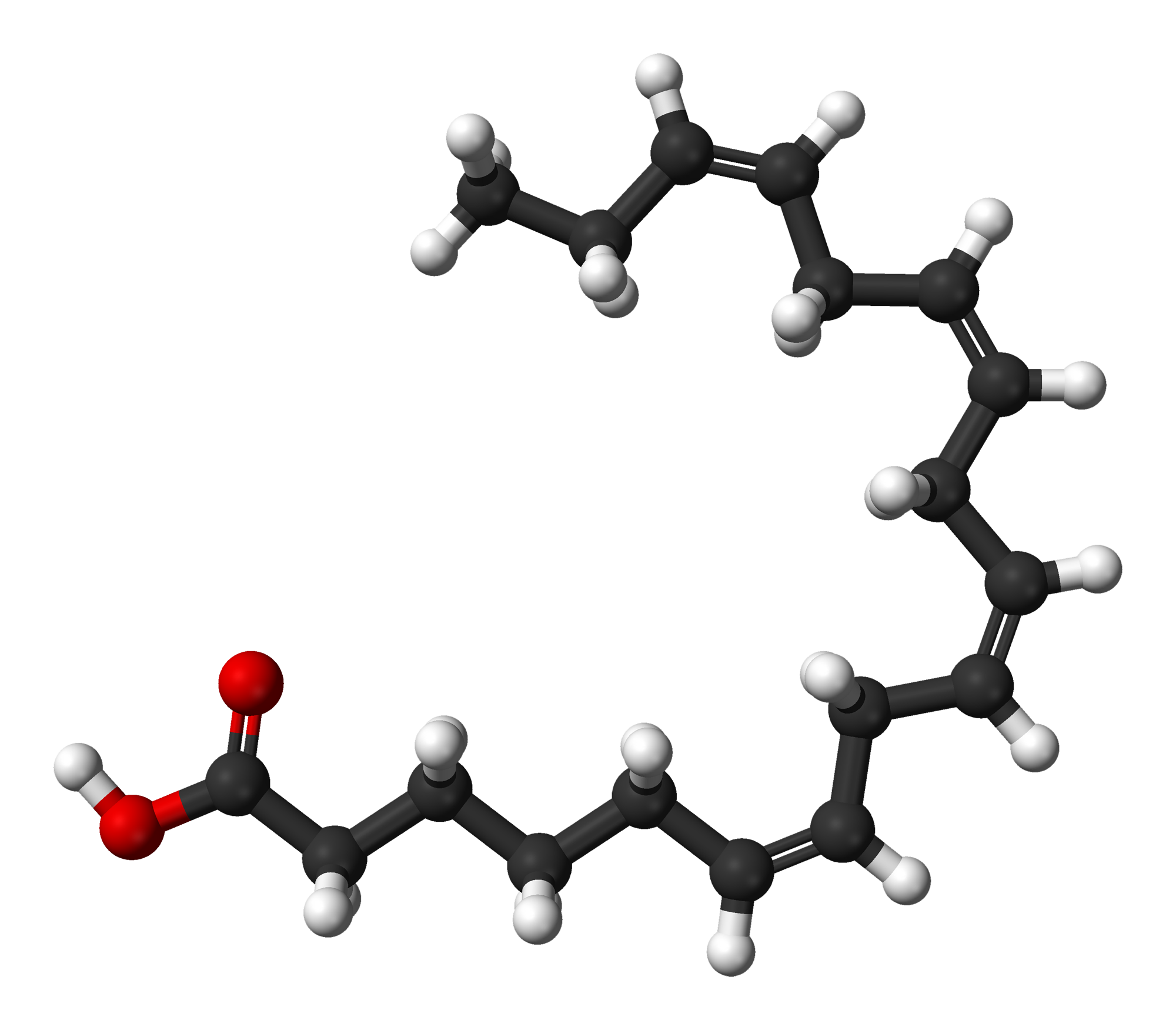

Names
- Preferred IUPAC name (6Z,9Z,12Z,15Z)-Octadeca-6,9,12,15-tetraenoic acid

Identifiers
CAS Number	20290-75-9
3D model (JSmol)	Interactive image
ChEBI	CHEBI:32389
ChEMBL	ChEMBL484430
ChemSpider	4471933
ECHA InfoCard	100.127.224
PubChem CID	5312508
UNII	P4CEK3495O
CompTox Dashboard (EPA)	DTXSID20920493
- InChI: InChI=1S/C18H28O2/c1-2-3-4-5-6-7-8-9-10-11-12-13-14-15-16-17-18(19)20/h3-4,6-7,9-10,12-13H,2,5,8,11,14-17H2,1H3,(H,19,20)/b4-3-,7-6-,10-9-,13-12- Key: JIWBIWFOSCKQMA-LTKCOYKYSA-N; InChI=1/C18H28O2/c1-2-3-4-5-6-7-8-9-10-11-12-13-14-15-16-17-18(19)20/h3-4,6-7,9-10,12-13H,2,5,8,11,14-17H2,1H3,(H,19,20)/b4-3-,7-6-,10-9-,13-12- Key: JIWBIWFOSCKQMA-LTKCOYKYBT
- SMILES: O=C(O)CCCC\C=C/C\C=C/C\C=C/C\C=C/CC

Properties
Chemical formula	C_{18}H_{28}O_{2}
Molar mass	276.420 g·mol^{−1}
Density	0.9334 g/cm^{3} (15 °C)
Melting point	200 °C (392 °F; 473 K) decomposition
- Except where otherwise noted, data are given for materials in their standard state (at 25 °C [77 °F], 100 kPa). verify (what is ?) Infobox references

Stearidonic acid (SDA: C_{18}H_{28}O_{2}; 18:4, n-3) is an ω-3 fatty acid, sometimes called moroctic acid.

== Biosynthesis ==
It is biosynthesized from alpha-linolenic acid (ALA: C_{18}H_{30}O_{2}; 18:3, n-3) by the enzyme delta-6-desaturase, which removes two hydrogen (H) atoms.

== Metabolism ==
Stearidonic acid is involved in the synthesis of longer-chain ω-3 fatty acids in animals (including humans), plants, and bacteria. It is a precursor to eicosapentaenoic acid via a eicosatetraenoic acid (20:4 ω-3) intermediate. Studies in human volunteers and cell cultures suggest that SDA increases EPA levels more efficiently than an equimolar amount of ALA.

SDA is also a precursor to N-acylethanolamine (NAEs).

== Sources ==
Natural sources of this fatty acid are the seed oils of hemp (between 0.16 and 1.54% of the oil), blackcurrant (between 2.5 and 4.5%), Buglossoides arvensis (corn gromwell), and Echium plantagineum, and the cyanobacterium Spirulina.

As it is a precursor to other fatty acids, there has been efforts to enhance the content of stearidonic acid in various crops, such as soybeans. A GMO soybean source is approved by the European Food Safety Authority.

SDA can also be synthesized in a lab.

== See also ==
- List of omega-3 fatty acids
- Omega-3 fatty acids
- Essential fatty acids
