= Γ-Linolenic acid =

18-Carbon polyunsaturated fatty acid

γ-Linolenic acid
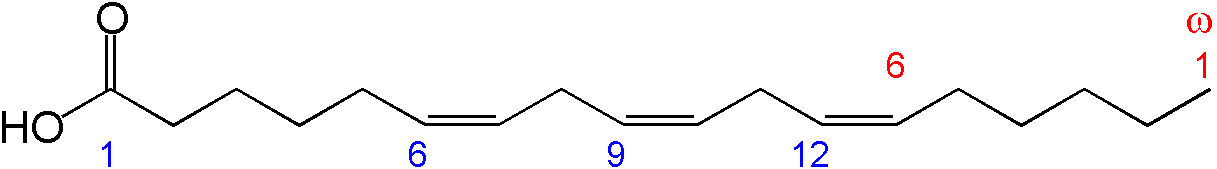

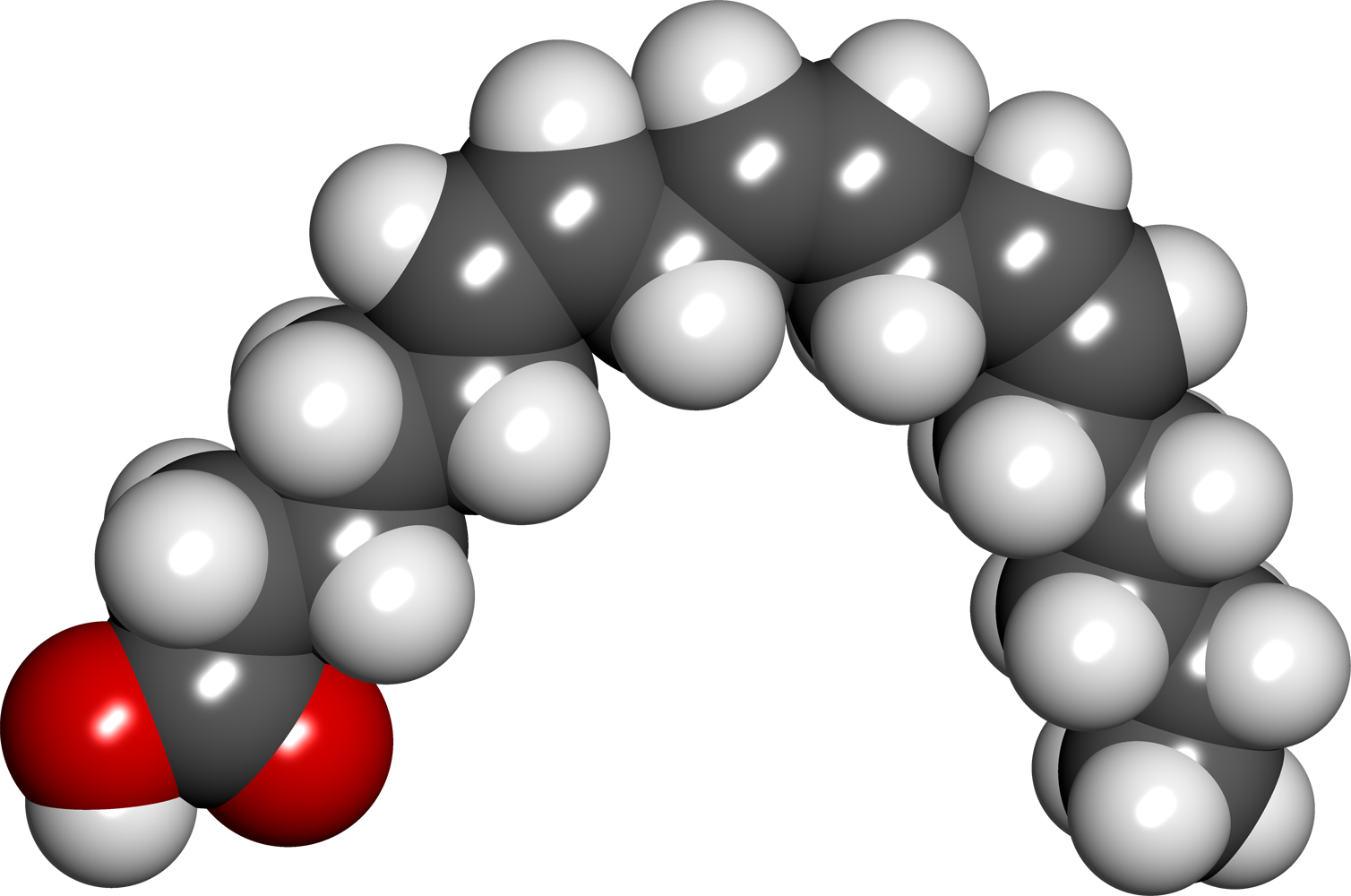

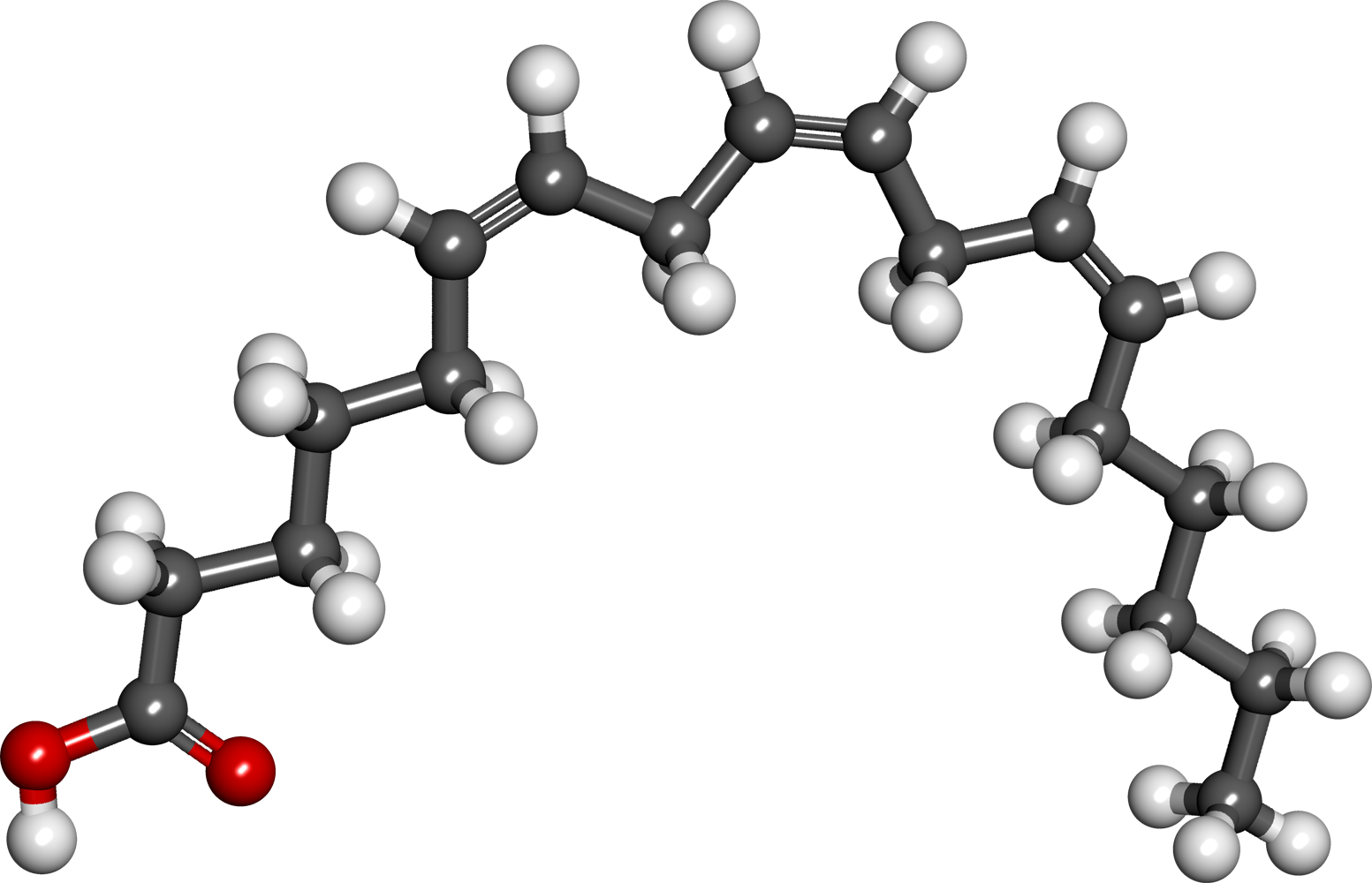

Names
- Preferred IUPAC name (6Z,9Z,12Z)-Octadeca-6,9,12-trienoic acid
- Other names Gamma-linolenic acid, gamolenic acid, GLA

Identifiers
CAS Number	506-26-3
3D model (JSmol)	Interactive image
ChEBI	CHEBI:28661
ChEMBL	ChEMBL464982
ChemSpider	4444436
ECHA InfoCard	100.107.263
IUPHAR/BPS	4710
PubChem CID	5280933
UNII	78YC2MAX4O
CompTox Dashboard (EPA)	DTXSID7046170
- InChI: InChI=1S/C18H30O2/c1-2-3-4-5-6-7-8-9-10-11-12-13-14-15-16-17-18(19)20/h6-7,9-10,12-13H,2-5,8,11,14-17H2,1H3,(H,19,20)/b7-6-,10-9-,13-12- Key: VZCCETWTMQHEPK-QNEBEIHSSA-N; InChI=1/C18H30O2/c1-2-3-4-5-6-7-8-9-10-11-12-13-14-15-16-17-18(19)20/h6-7,9-10,12-13H,2-5,8,11,14-17H2,1H3,(H,19,20)/b7-6-,10-9-,13-12- Key: VZCCETWTMQHEPK-QNEBEIHSBP
- SMILES: O=C(O)CCCC\C=C/C\C=C/C\C=C/CCCCC

Properties
Chemical formula	C_{18}H_{30}O_{2}
Molar mass	278.436 g·mol^{−1}
Appearance	Colorless oil

Pharmacology
ATC code	D11AX02 (WHO)
- Except where otherwise noted, data are given for materials in their standard state (at 25 °C [77 °F], 100 kPa). verify (what is ?) Infobox references

γ-Linolenic acid or GLA (INN: gamolenic acid) is an n−6, or omega-6, fatty acid found primarily in seed oils. When acting on GLA, arachidonate 5-lipoxygenase produces no leukotrienes and the conversion by the enzyme of arachidonic acid to leukotrienes is inhibited.

== Chemistry ==
GLA is categorized as an n−6 (also called ω−6 or omega-6) fatty acid, meaning that the first double bond on the methyl end (designated with n or ω) is the sixth bond. In physiological literature, GLA is designated as 18:3 (n−6). GLA is a carboxylic acid with an 18-carbon chain and three cis double bonds. It is a regioisomer of α-linolenic acid, which is a polyunsaturated n−3 (omega-3) fatty acid, found in rapeseed canola oil, soybeans, walnuts, flax seed (linseed oil), perilla, chia, and hemp seed.

== History ==
GLA was first isolated from the seed oil of evening primrose. This herbal plant was grown by Native Americans to treat swelling in the body. In the 17th century, it was introduced to Europe and became a popular folk remedy, earning the name king's cure-all. In 1919, Heiduschka and Lüft extracted the oil from evening primrose seeds and described an unusual linolenic acid, which they name γ-. Later, the exact chemical structure was characterized by Riley.

Although there are α- and γ- forms of linolenic acid, there is no β- form. One was once identified, but it turned out to be an artifact of the original analytical process.

== Sources ==
=== Dietary sources ===
GLA is relatively rare in the human diet. It is present in small amounts in oats and barley. According to the USDA Standard Release, it is present in hemp seeds (1.34% by mass), some vegetable oil products (0.59% in soft margarine), and some meats (0.1% in chicken skin). USDA lists it as not found in canola, soybean, corn, coconut, or flaxseed oil, which is surprising given the reported presence in margarine and salad dressings.

Spirulina lipid contains 18-21% GLA. However, only 7.8% of Spirulina is lipid by dry mass, so the overall content by dry mass is closer to 1.23%.

=== Human biosynthesis ===
The human body produces GLA from linoleic acid (LA). This reaction is catalyzed by Δ^{6}-desaturase (D6D), an enzyme that allows the creation of a double bond on the sixth carbon counting from the carboxyl terminus. LA is consumed sufficiently in most diets, from such abundant sources as cooking oils and meats. However, a lack of GLA can occur when there is a reduction of the efficiency of the D6D conversion (for instance, as people grow older or when there are specific dietary deficiencies) or in disease states wherein there is excessive consumption of GLA metabolites.

=== Concentrated sources ===
Significant amounts of GLA are found in specialty seed oils such as evening primrose (Oenothera biennis) oil (EPO, 8–14%), blackcurrant seed oil (15–20%), borage seed oil (17-25%), Lithospermum purpurocaeruleum oil (18%), Onosmodium molle oil (20%), Symphaticum officinale oil (27%), and hemp seed oil (0.5–4.5%). Normal safflower (Carthamus tinctorius) oil does not contain GLA, but a genetically modified GLA safflower oil available in commercial quantities since 2011 contains 40% GLA. These concentrated sources are useful in the production of GLA dietary supplements.

Fungi are also prolific producers of GLA. Some fungi produce biomass with lipid levels comparable to seeds (up to 70% by dry mass). These fungi can therefore be grown industrially to obtain large amounts of GLA-rich (13.2–49%) fungal lipids. The fungi Mucor circinelloides and Mucor plumbeus are prolific producers of GLA, efficient enough for industrial use. Other useful fungi include Mortierella vinacea, Mortierella ramanniana, Mortierella isabellina, Rhizopus stolonifera, Rhizopus nigricans, Rhizopus oryzae, and Cunninghamella elegans.

== Source of eicosanoids ==
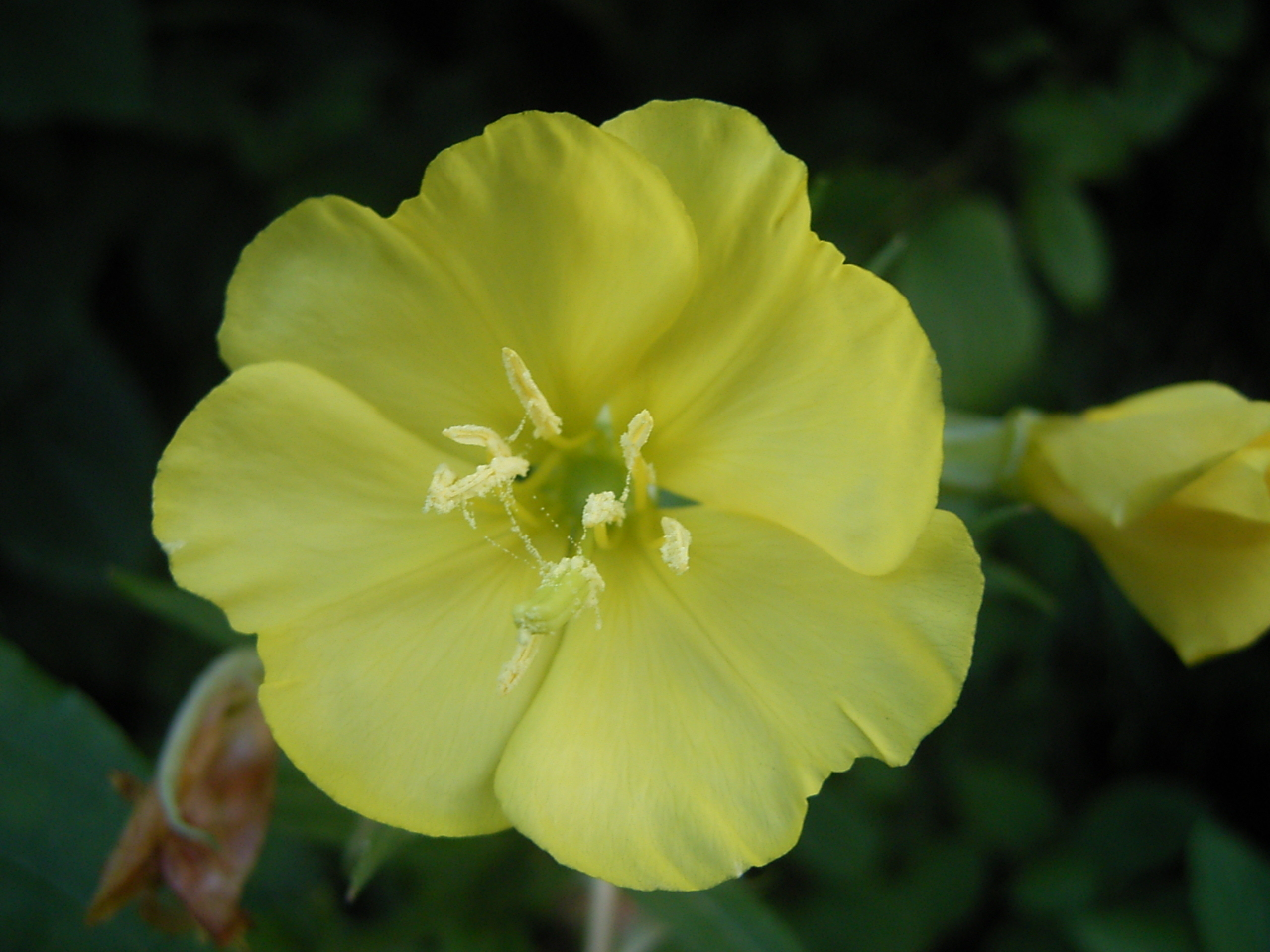
The seed oil of Oenothera biennis (evening primrose) is a source of GLA.

From GLA, the body forms dihomo-γ-linolenic acid (DGLA). This is one of the body's three sources of eicosanoids (along with AA and EPA.) DGLA is the precursor of the prostaglandin PGH_{1}, which in turn forms PGE_{1} and the thromboxane TXA_{1}. Both PGE1_{1} and TXA_{1} are anti-inflammatory; thromboxane TXA_{1}, unlike its series-2 variant, induces vasodilation, and inhibits platelet consequently, TXA_{1} modulates (reduces) the pro-inflammatory properties of the thromboxane TXA_{2}. PGE_{1} has a role in regulation of immune system function and is used as the medicine alprostadil.

Unlike AA and EPA, DGLA cannot yield leukotrienes. However, it can inhibit the formation of pro-inflammatory leukotrienes from AA.

Although GLA is an n−6 fatty acid, a type of acid that is, in general, pro-inflammatory, it has anti-inflammatory properties. (See discussion at Essential fatty acid interactions: The paradox of dietary GLA.)

== Topical use ==
In 2002, the UK Medicines and Healthcare products Regulatory Agency withdrew marketing authorisations for evening primrose oil as an eczema remedy. The BMJ commented in 2003 that it had taken 20 years to demonstrate that the substance was of no use in atopic dermatitis, and called for more transparency in the research on which drug licensing decisions were taken.
