= Chia =

Chia or CHIA may refer to:

== Plants ==
- Amaranthus hypochondriacus, an ornamental plant known as Prince-of-Wales feather or quelite, among other names
- Mesosphaerum suaveolens, an herb also known as pignut or chain
- The following species of Salvia:
  - Salvia lavanduloides
  - Salvia columbariae, a herbaceous annual plant that is commonly called chia, chia sage, golden chia, or desage
  - Salvia hispanica, a herbaceous annual plant commonly called chia, used in Chia Pet products
  - Salvia longispicata
  - Salvia polystachia, a herbaceous perennial plant native to Mexico, Guatemala and Panama
  - Salvia tiliifolia, a herbaceous annual commonly called lindenleaf sage or Tarahumara chia

== Plant products ==
- Chia seed, edible seeds of one of the Salvia plant species above, usually Salvia hispanica

== Places ==
- Chía, Aragon, a municipality in Spain
- Chía, Cundinamarca, a town and municipality in Colombia
- Chia (Sardinia), a coastal area and village in Sardinia, Italy
- Chia, Lazio, a frazione in Soriano nel Cimino, central Italy

== Personal names ==
- Chia (surname), a surname in various cultures
  - Xie (surname), a Chinese surname often spelled Chia in Singapore and Malaysia
  - Jia (surname), a Chinese surname often spelled Chia in Taiwan or in the early 20th century
- A Spanish variant of the name Lucia

== Other uses ==
- Chia (cryptocurrency), a proof-of-space-and-time (Storage provided over amount of time) cryptocurrency
- Chía (goddess), a deity in Muisca mythology
- Chia Pet, American figurines
- ChIA-PET, a molecular biological technique
- "Chia", a song by Four Tet from the album Rounds
- Chia Black Dragon, a series of dark fantasy novels by Stephen Marley
- Masala chai, called chia in Nepal
- CHIA, a gene the encodes a type of chitinase (see chitinase#Acidic mammalian chitinase)
