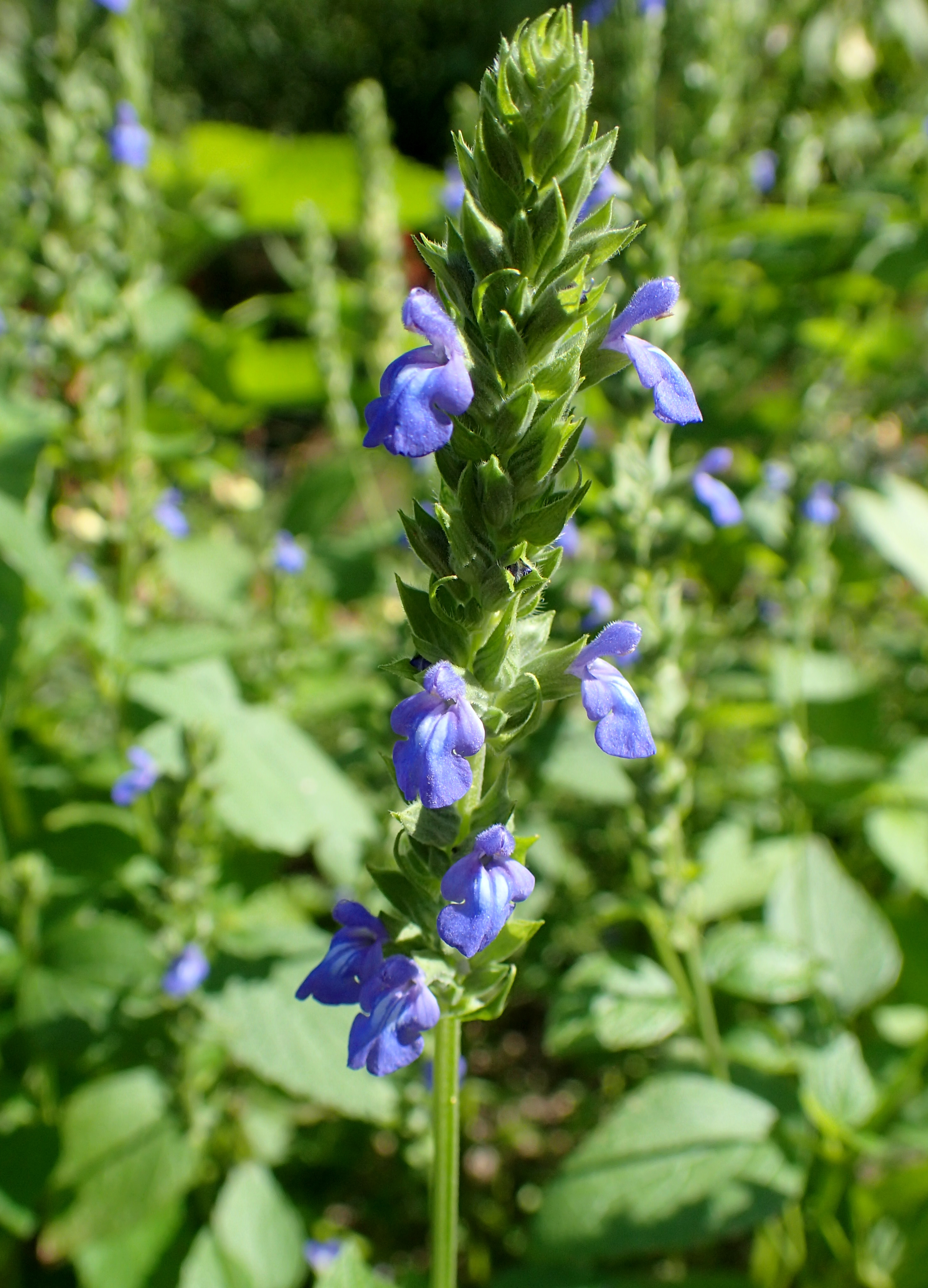

Scientific classification
- Kingdom: Plantae
- Clade: Tracheophytes
- Clade: Angiosperms
- Clade: Eudicots
- Clade: Asterids
- Order: Lamiales
- Family: Lamiaceae
- Genus: Salvia
- Species: S. hispanica

Binomial name
- Salvia hispanica L.

Synonyms
- Kiosmina hispanica (L.) Raf.; Salvia chia Colla; Salvia chia Sessé & Moc. nom. illeg.; Salvia neohispanica Briq. nom. illeg.; Salvia prysmatica Cav.; Salvia schiedeana Stapf; Salvia tetragona Moench

= Salvia hispanica =

Species of flowering plant in the mint family

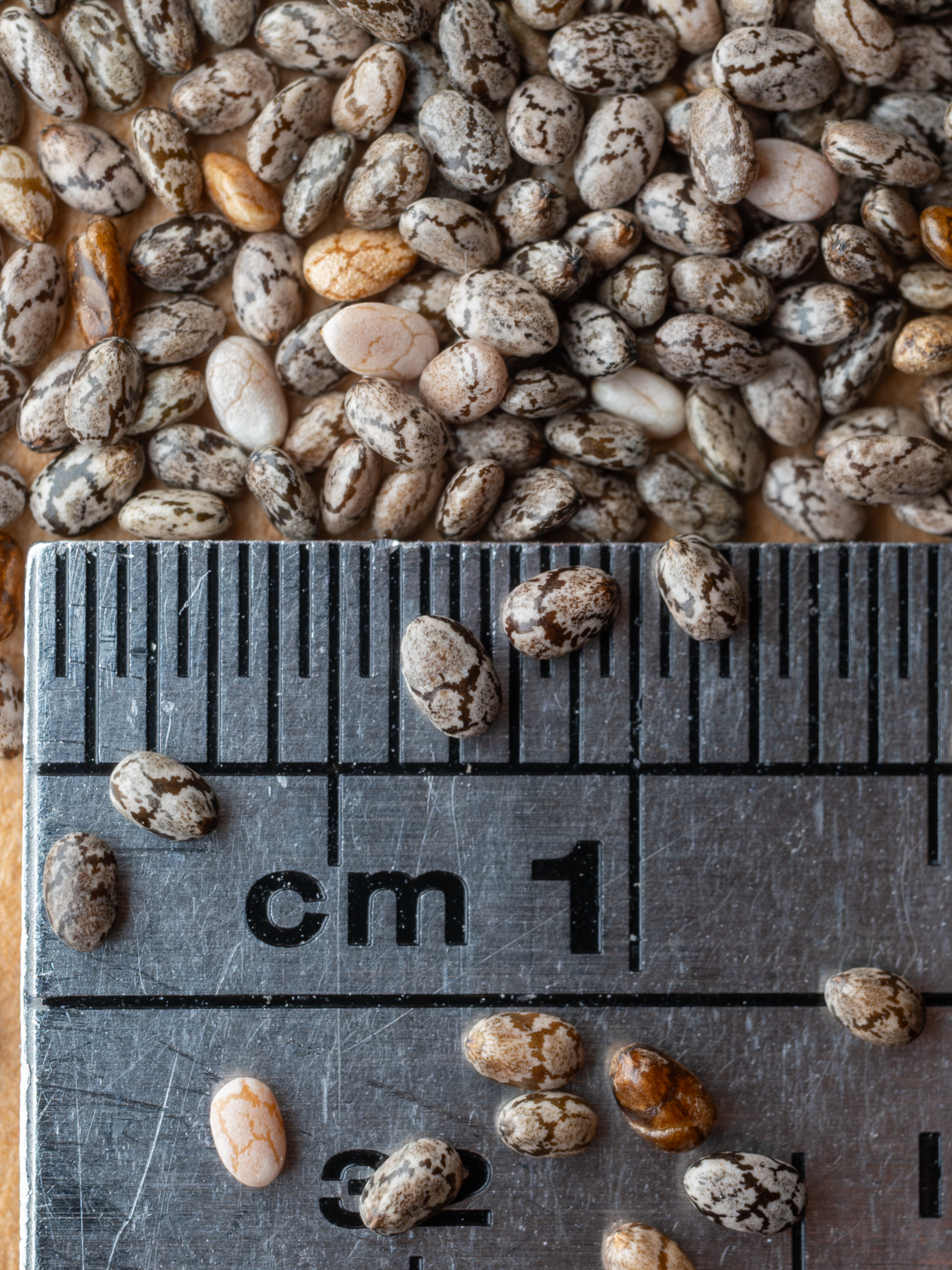
Chia seeds with cm scale

Salvia hispanica, one of several related species commonly known as chia (/ˈtʃiːə/), is a species of flowering plant in the mint family, Lamiaceae. It is native to central and southern Mexico and Guatemala. It is considered a pseudocereal, cultivated for its edible, hydrophilic chia seed, grown and commonly used as food in several countries of western South America, western Mexico, and the southwestern United States.

== Description ==
Chia is an annual herb growing up to 1.75 metres (5 feet 9 inches) tall, with opposite leaves that are 4–8 cm (1 1/2–3 1/4 in) long and 3–5 cm (1 1/4–2 in) wide. Its flowers are purple or white and are produced in numerous clusters in a spike at the end of each stem.

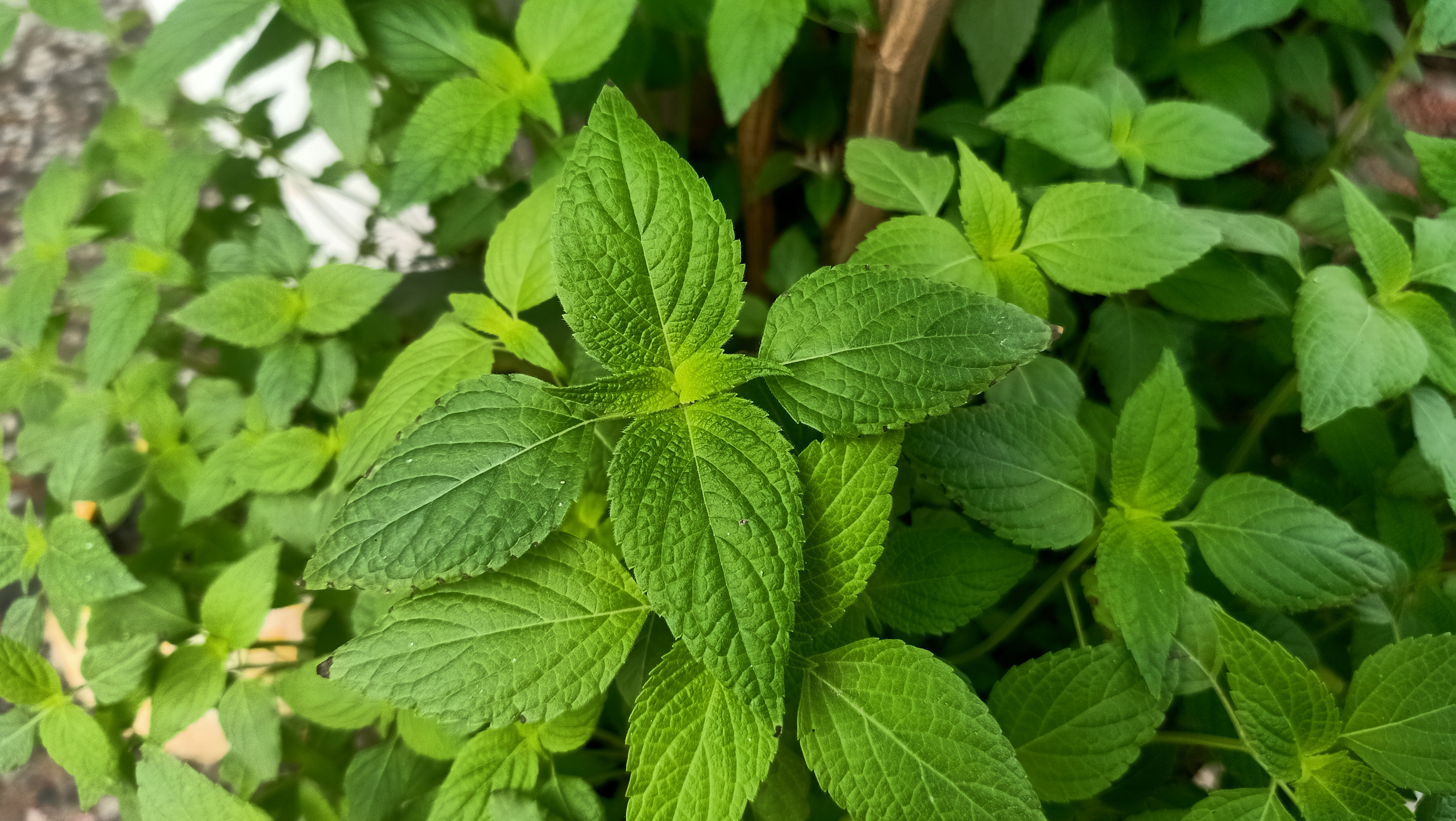
Chia leaves

Typically, the seeds are small ovals with a diameter around 1 mm (1/32 in). They are mottle-colored, with brown, gray, black, and white. The seeds are hydrophilic, absorbing up to 12 times their weight in liquid when soaked. While soaking, the seeds develop a mucilaginous coating that gives chia-based beverages a distinctive gelatinous texture.

Many plants cultivated as S. hispanica are in fact S. officinalis subsp. lavandulifolia (syn. S. lavandulifolia).

== Etymology ==
The word chia is derived from the Nahuatl word chian, meaning 'oily'.^{[1]}

Other plants known as chia include Salvia columbariae, which is sometimes called "golden chia", Salvia polystachia, and Salvia tiliifolia.

== Distribution and habitat ==
Chia is native to central and southern Mexico and Guatemala. It is hardy from USDA Zones 9–12.

== Cultivation ==
Chia is grown and consumed commercially in its native Mexico and Guatemala, as well as Bolivia, Ecuador, Colombia, Nicaragua, northwestern Argentina, parts of Australia, and the southwestern United States. New patented varieties of chia have been bred in Kentucky for cultivation in northern latitudes of the United States.

It is grown commercially for its seed, a food rich in omega-3 fatty acids since the seeds yield 25–30% extractable oil, including α-linolenic acid. Typical composition of the fat of the oil is 55% ω-3, 18% ω-6, 6% ω-9, and 10% saturated fat.

=== Climate and growing cycle length ===
The length of the growing cycle for chia varies based on location and is influenced by elevation. For production sites located in different ecosystems in Bolivia, Ecuador and northwestern Argentina, growing cycles are between 100 and 150 days in duration. Accordingly, commercial production fields are located in the range of 8–2,200 m (26–7,218 ft) altitude across a variety of ecosystems ranging from tropical coastal desert, to tropical rain forest, and inter-Andean dry valley. In northwestern Argentina, a time span from planting to harvest of 120–180 days is reported for fields located at elevations of 900–1,500 m (3,000–4,900 ft).

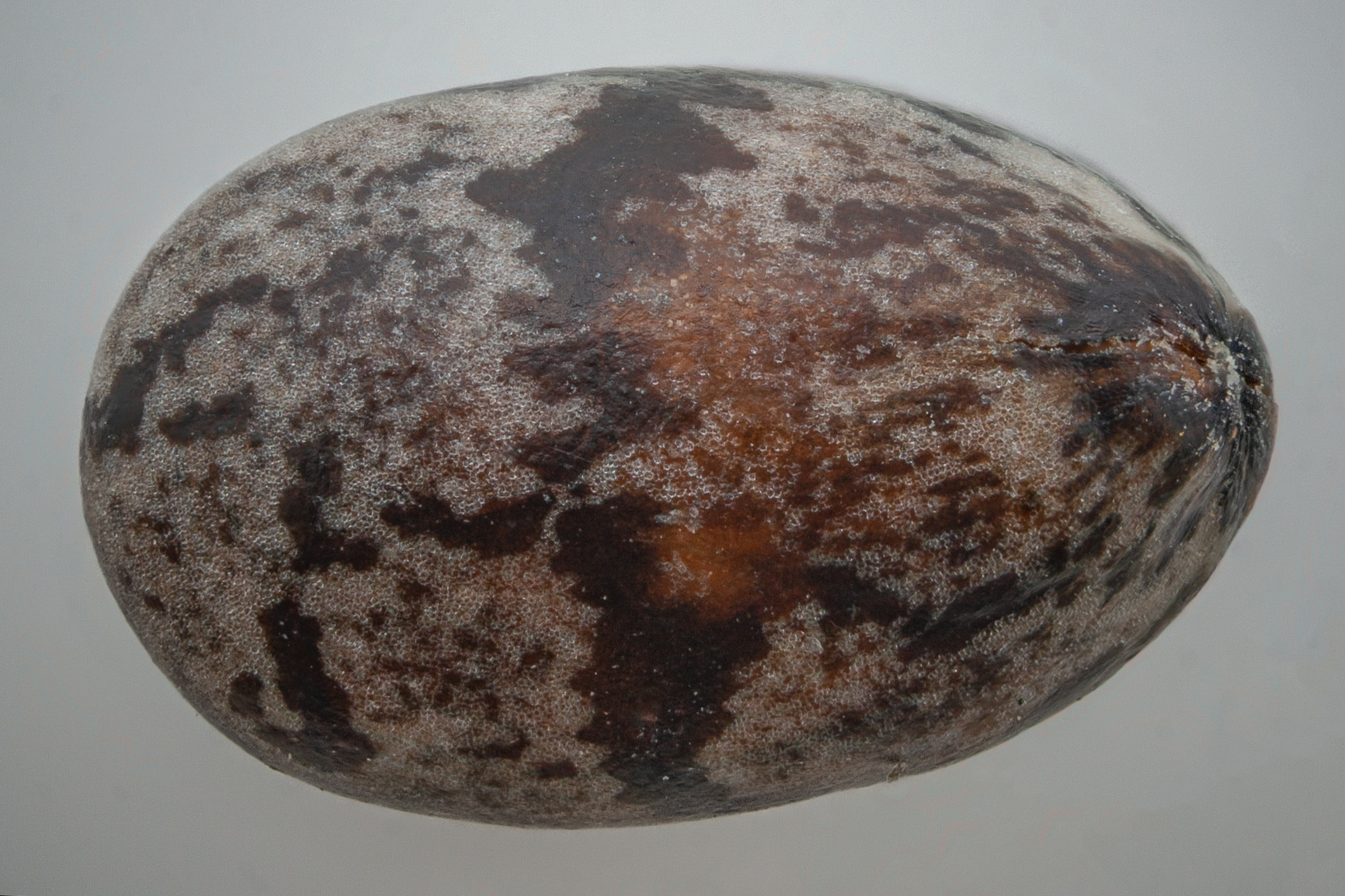
An extreme macro photograph of a chia seed

S. hispanica is a short-day flowering plant, indicating its photoperiodic sensitivity and lack of photoperiodic variability in traditional cultivars, which limited commercial use of chia seeds to tropical and subtropical latitudes until 2012. Now, traditional domesticated lines of Salvia species grow naturally or can be cultivated in temperate zones at higher latitudes in the United States. In Arizona and Kentucky, seed maturation of traditional chia cultivars is stopped by frost before or after flower set, preventing seed harvesting. Advances in plant breeding during 2012, however, led to development of new early-flowering chia genotypes proving to have higher yields in Kentucky.

=== Seed yield and composition ===
Seed yield varies depending on cultivars, mode of cultivation, and growing conditions by geographic region. For example, commercial fields in Argentina and Colombia vary in yield range from 450 to 1,250 kilograms per hectare (400 to 1,120 lb/acre). A small-scale study with three cultivars grown in the inter-Andean valleys of Ecuador produced yields up to 2,300 kg/ha (2,100 lb/acre), indicating that the favorable growing environment and cultivar interacted to produce the high yields. Genotype has a larger effect on yield than on protein content, oil content, fatty acid composition, or phenolic compounds, whereas high temperature reduces oil content and degree of unsaturation, and raises protein content.

=== Soil, seedbed requirements, and sowing ===
The cultivation of S. hispanica requires light to medium clay or sandy soils. The plant prefers well-drained, moderately fertile soils, but can cope with acid soils and moderate drought. Sown chia seeds need moisture for seedling establishment, while the maturing chia plant does not tolerate wet soils during growth.

Traditional cultivation techniques of S. hispanica include soil preparation by disruption and loosening followed by seed broadcasting. In modern commercial production, a typical sowing rate of 6 kg/ha (5.4 lb/acre) and row spacing of 0.7–0.8 m (2 ft 4 in – 2 ft 7 in) are usually applied.

=== Fertilization and irrigation ===
S. hispanica can be cultivated under low fertilizer input, using 100 kg/ha (89 lb/acre) nitrogen or in some cases, no fertilizer is used.

Irrigation frequency in chia production fields may vary from none to eight irrigations per growing season, depending on climatic conditions and rainfall.

Seeds, chia seeds, dried
Nutritional value per 100 g (3.5 oz)
- Energy: 486 kcal (2,030 kJ)
- Carbohydrates: 42.12 g
- Dietary fiber: 34.4 g
- Fat: 30.74 g
- Saturated: 3.330
- Trans: 0.140 g
- Monounsaturated: 2.309
- Polyunsaturated omega−3 omega−6: 23.665 17.830 g 5.835 g
- Protein: 16.54 g
Vitamins and minerals
Vitamins	Quantity %DV^{†}
Vitamin A equiv.	6% 54 μg
Thiamine (B1)	52% 0.62 mg
Riboflavin (B2)	13% 0.17 mg
Niacin (B3)	55% 8.83 mg
Folate (B9)	12% 49 μg
Vitamin C	2% 1.6 mg
Vitamin E	3% 0.5 mg
Minerals	Quantity %DV^{†}
Calcium	49% 631 mg
Iron	43% 7.72 mg
Magnesium	80% 335 mg
Manganese	118% 2.723 mg
Phosphorus	69% 860 mg
Potassium	14% 407 mg
Sodium	1% 16 mg
Zinc	42% 4.58 mg
- Other constituents: Quantity
- Water: 5.80 g
- Full Link to USDA Database entry
- ^{†}Percentages estimated using US recommendations for adults, except for potassium, which is estimated based on expert recommendation from the National Academies.

=== Genetic diversity and breeding ===
The wide range of wild and cultivated varieties of S. hispanica are based on seed size, shattering of seeds, and seed color. Seed weight and color have high heritability, with a single recessive gene responsible for white color.

=== Diseases and crop management ===
Currently, no major pests or diseases affect chia production. Essential oils in chia leaves have repellent properties against insects, making it suitable for organic cultivation. Virus infections, however, possibly transmitted by white flies, may occur. Weeds may present a problem in the early development of the chia crop until its canopy closes, but because chia is sensitive to most commonly used herbicides, mechanical weed control is preferred.

== Nutrition ==
Dried chia seeds are 6% water, 42% carbohydrates, 17% protein, and 31% fat (table). In a reference amount of 100 grams (3.5 oz), chia seeds supply 486 calories and are a rich source (20% or more of the Daily Value, DV) of several B vitamins and dietary minerals (table).
