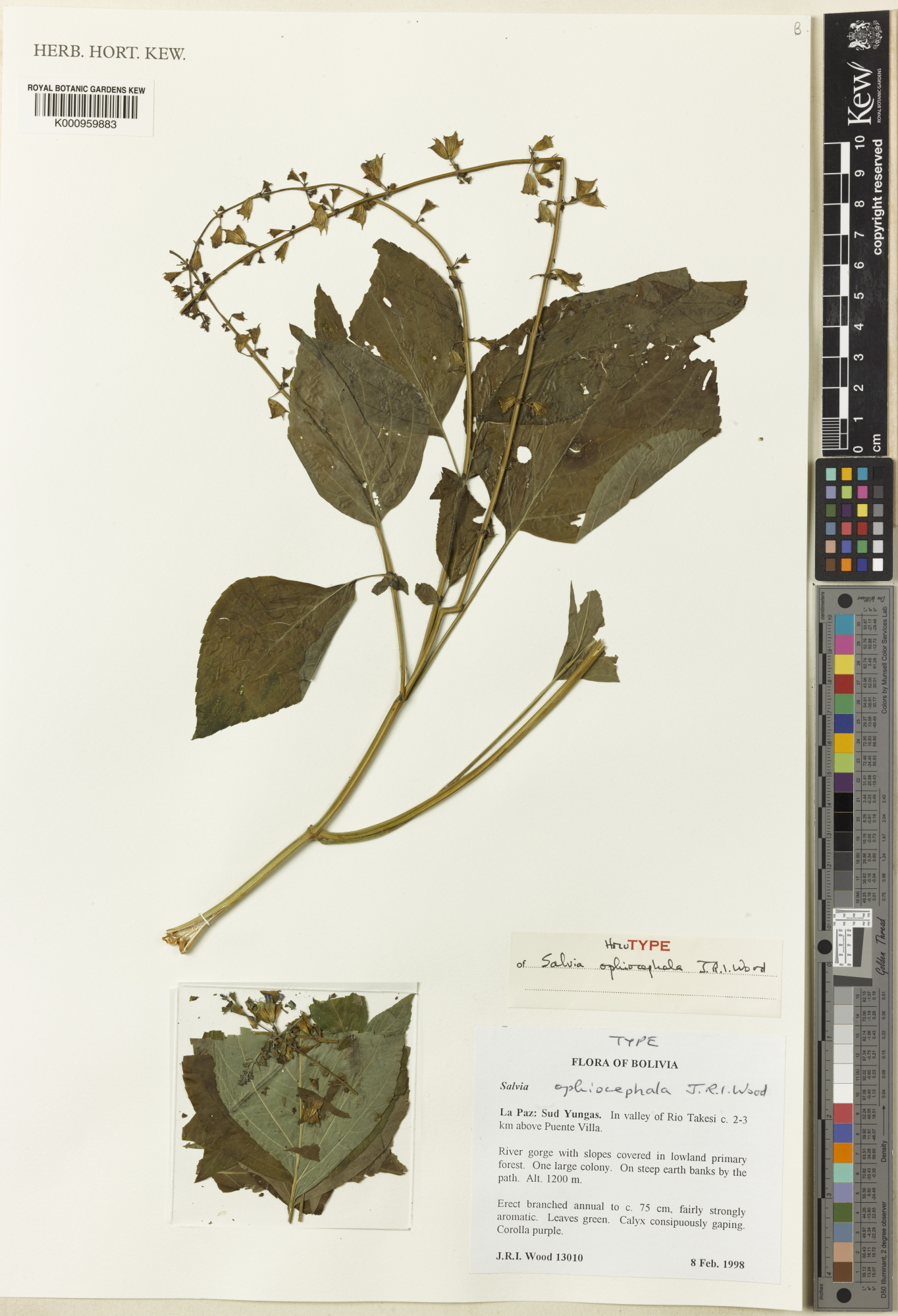

Scientific classification
- Kingdom: Plantae
- Clade: Tracheophytes
- Clade: Angiosperms
- Clade: Eudicots
- Clade: Asterids
- Order: Lamiales
- Family: Lamiaceae
- Genus: Salvia
- Species: S. ophiocephala

Binomial name
- Salvia ophiocephala J. R. I. Wood

= Salvia ophiocephala =

Species of herb

Salvia ophiocephala is an annual herb that is endemic to Bolivia—as of 2007 there was only known to be one small colony growing in a Yungas forest valley at 1,200 metres (3,900 ft) elevation. The site is close to settlements and gold-mining, and therefore the plant is considered critically endangered. The specific epithet, ophiocephala, refers to the distinctive teeth in the calyx mouth which hints at the open mouth of a striking rattlesnake. It appears to be related to Salvia personata.

S. ophiocephala is an upright, many branched herb that grows up to 75 centimetres (30 in) high, with petiolate elliptic leaves that are 3 to 15 cm (1.2 to 5.9 in) by 1.5 to 9 cm (0.59 to 3.54 in). The inflorescence of simple racemes, with as many as 12 verticillasters that are 4–6-flowered, vary in length. The 15 cm (5.9 in) corolla is dirty white with blue lips, held in a calyx whose veins extend as teeth.
