= Α-Linolenic acid =

18-Carbon polyunsaturated fatty acid

α-Linolenic acid

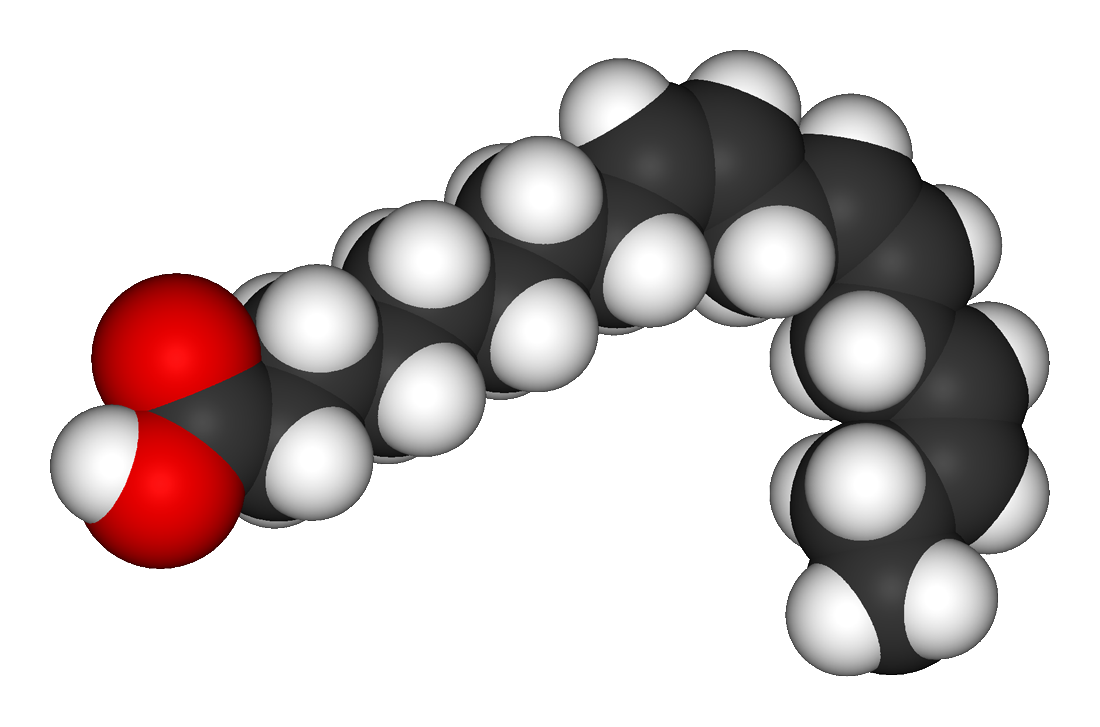

Names
- Preferred IUPAC name (9Z,12Z,15Z)-Octadeca-9,12,15-trienoic acid
- Other names ALA; LNA; Linolenic acid; cis,cis,cis-9,12,15-Octadecatrienoic acid; (9Z,12Z,15Z)-9,12,15-Octadecatrienoic acid; Industrene 120

Identifiers
CAS Number	463-40-1
3D model (JSmol)	Interactive image; Interactive image
ChEBI	CHEBI:27432
ChEMBL	ChEMBL8739
ChemSpider	4444437
DrugBank	DB00132
ECHA InfoCard	100.006.669
IUPHAR/BPS	1049
PubChem CID	5280934
UNII	0RBV727H71
CompTox Dashboard (EPA)	DTXSID7025506
- InChI: InChI=1S/C18H30O2/c1-2-3-4-5-6-7-8-9-10-11-12-13-14-15-16-17-18(19)20/h3-4,6-7,9-10H,2,5,8,11-17H2,1H3,(H,19,20)/b4-3-,7-6-,10-9- Key: DTOSIQBPPRVQHS-PDBXOOCHSA-N; InChI=1/C18H30O2/c1-2-3-4-5-6-7-8-9-10-11-12-13-14-15-16-17-18(19)20/h3-4,6-7,9-10H,2,5,8,11-17H2,1H3,(H,19,20)/b4-3-,7-6-,10-9- Key: DTOSIQBPPRVQHS-PDBXOOCHBH
- SMILES: O=C(O)CCCCCCC\C=C/C\C=C/C\C=C/CC; CC/C=C\C/C=C\C/C=C\CCCCCCCC(=O)O

Properties
Chemical formula	C_{18}H_{30}O_{2}
Molar mass	278.436 g·mol^{−1}
Density	0.9164 g/cm^{3}
Melting point	−11 °C (12 °F; 262 K)
Boiling point	232 °C (450 °F; 505 K) at 17.0 mmHg
Solubility in acetonitrile	309.057 g/L (-34.5 °C)
- Except where otherwise noted, data are given for materials in their standard state (at 25 °C [77 °F], 100 kPa). verify (what is ?) Infobox references

α-Linolenic acid, also known as alpha-linolenic acid (ALA) (from Greek alpha denoting "first" and linon meaning flax), is an n−3, or omega-3, essential fatty acid. ALA is found in many seeds and oils, including flaxseed, walnuts, chia, hemp, and many common vegetable oils.

In terms of its structure, it is named all-cis-9,12,15-octadecatrienoic acid. In physiological literature, it is listed by its lipid number, 18:3 (n−3). It is a carboxylic acid with an 18-carbon chain and three cis double bonds. The first double bond is located at the third carbon from the methyl end of the fatty acid chain, known as the n end. Thus, α-linolenic acid is a polyunsaturated n−3 (omega-3) fatty acid. It is a regioisomer of gamma-linolenic acid (GLA), an 18:3 (n−6) fatty acid (i.e., a polyunsaturated omega-6 fatty acid with three double bonds).

== Etymology ==
The word linolenic is an irregular derivation from linoleic, which itself is derived from the Greek word linon (flax). Oleic means "of or relating to oleic acid" because saturating an omega-6 double bond of linoleic acid produces oleic acid. Similarly saturating one of linolenic acid's double bonds produces linoleic acid.

== Dietary sources ==
Seed oils are the richest sources of α-linolenic acid, notably those of hempseed, chia, perilla, flaxseed (linseed oil), rapeseed (canola), and soybeans. Additionally, small amounts of α-linolenic acid can be obtained through the consumption of meats such as chicken. The ALA content of animal products can be raised through a feed supplemented with hemp seed and flaxseed.

Some studies state that ALA remains stable during processing and cooking. However, other studies state that ALA might not be suitable for baking as it will polymerize with itself, a feature exploited in paint with transition metal catalysts. Some ALA may also oxidize at baking temperatures. ALA percentages in the table below refer to the oils extracted from each item.

Common name	Alternate name	Linnaean name	% ALA^{†}(of oil)	ref.
Chia	chia sage	Salvia hispanica	64%	
Kiwifruit seeds	Chinese gooseberry	Actinidia chinensis	62%	
Perilla	shiso	Perilla frutescens	58%	
Flax	linseed	Linum usitatissimum	55%	
Lingonberry	cowberry	Vaccinium vitis-idaea	49%	
Camelina	camelina	Camelina sativa	37%	
Purslane	portulaca	Portulaca oleracea	35%	
Cuckoo flower	mayflower	Cardamine pratensis	35%	
Cranberry	American cranberry	Vaccinium macrocarpon	35%	
Sea buckthorn	seaberry	Hippophae rhamnoides L.	32%	
Raspberry	raspberry	Rubus idaeus	31%	
Blueberry	bilberry	Vaccinium myrtillus L.	29%	
Hemp	cannabis	Cannabis sativa	20%	
Walnut	English walnut / Persian walnut	Juglans regia	10.4%	
Rapeseed	canola	Brassica napus	10%	
Soybean	soya	Glycine max	8%	
			^{†}average value	

== Biological function ==
=== In plants ===
α-Linolenic acid is also obtained from the thylakoid membranes in the leaves of Pisum sativum (pea leaves). Plant chloroplasts consisting of more than 95 percent of photosynthetic thylakoid membranes are highly fluid due to the large abundance of ALA, evident as sharp resonances in high-resolution carbon-13 NMR spectra. α-Linolenic acid is also the starting substrate for the biosynthesis of jasmonate, and jasmonate production is controlled by the availability of α-Linolenic acid released by cell membranes.

== Metabolism ==
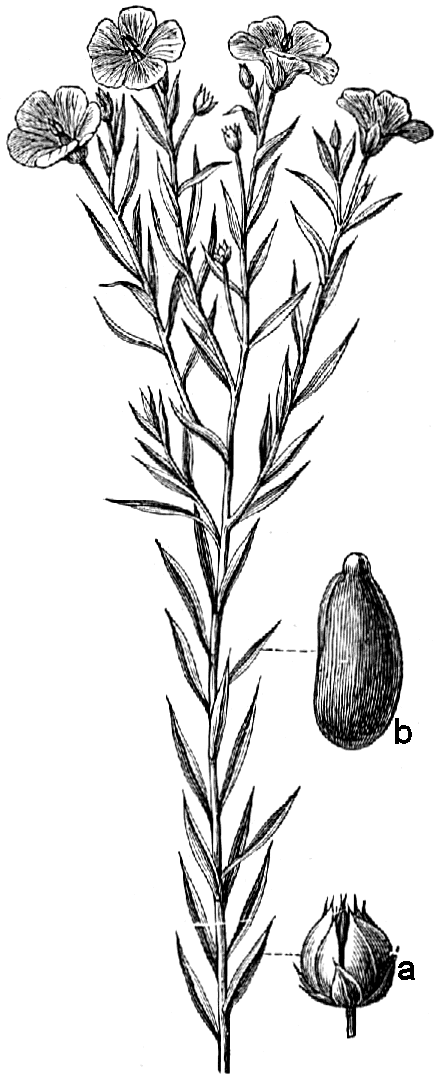
Flax is a rich source of α-linolenic acid.

α-Linolenic acid can be obtained by humans only through their diets. Humans lack the Δ-12 and Δ-15 desaturase enzymes required for processing stearic acid into A-linoleic acid or other unsaturated fatty acids.

Dietary α-linolenic acid is metabolized to stearidonic acid, a precursor to a collection of polyunsaturated 20-, 22-, 24-, etc fatty acids (eicosatetraenoic acid, eicosapentaenoic acid, docosapentaenoic acid, tetracosapentaenoic acid, 6,9,12,15,18,21-tetracosahexaenoic acid, docosahexaenoic acid). Because the efficacy of n−3 long-chain polyunsaturated fatty acid (LC-PUFA) synthesis decreases down the cascade of α-linolenic acid conversion, DHA synthesis from α-linolenic acid is even more restricted than that of EPA. Conversion of ALA to DHA is higher in women than in men. This is likely due to the increased need for DHA in women in order to support a developing fetus and in producing breastmilk containing DHA. Conversion depends on desaturase and elongase enzymes encoded by the FADS ( FADS1, FADS2) and ELOVL (ELOVL2, ELOVL5) genes. Specific variants in the FADS cluster are associated with increased circulating levels of EPA and DHA.

=== Biosynthesis ===
α-Linolenic acid is synthesized starting from stearic acid, which itself is synthesized through a general fatty acid synthesis pathway. Stearic acid is subsequently converted into oleic acid by Δ-9-desaturase. Then, oleic acid is converted into linoleic acid by Δ-12-desaturase. Finally, linoleic acid is converted into α-Linolenic acid by Δ-15-desaturase.

=== Stability and hydrogenation ===
Compared to many other oils, α-linolenic acid is more susceptible to oxidation. It becomes rancid more quickly in air. Oxidative instability of α-linolenic acid is one reason why producers choose to partially hydrogenate oils containing α-linolenic acid, such as soybean oil. Soybeans are the largest source of edible oils in the U.S., and, as of a 2007 study, 40% of soy oil production was partially hydrogenated.

The source of susceptibility to oxidation in α-linolenic acid is presence of four bis-allylic hydrogen atoms. The Gibbs free energy of abstracting these hydrogens is uniquely low due to the potential for radical delocalization in the lipid radical product. This potential for delocalization confers a stabilizing effect that makes the overall oxidation pathway more favorable. Additionally, α-linolenic acid has four bis-allylic hydrogens compared to just 2 in linoleic acid, making abstraction more likely.

Hydrogenation of ALA-containing fats can introduce trans fats. Consumers are increasingly avoiding products that contain trans fats, and governments have begun to ban trans fats in food products, including the US government as of May 2018. These regulations and market pressures have spurred the development of soybeans low in α-linolenic acid. These new soybean varieties yield a more stable oil that often do not require hydrogenation for many applications.

=== Health ===
ALA is an essential fatty acid, meaning consumption of ALA in the diet is required for human life, along with all other mammals. ALA consumption is associated with a lower risk of cardiovascular disease and a reduced risk of fatal coronary heart disease. The recommended dietary intake of ALA is 1.6 g/day for men. For women, the recommended intake is 1.1 g/day, with intakes increasing to 1.4 g/day during pregnancy and 1.3 g/day during breastfeeding. Dietary ALA intake can improve lipid profiles by decreasing triglycerides, total cholesterol, high-density lipoprotein, and low-density lipoprotein. A 2021 review found that ALA intake is associated with a reduced risk of mortality from all causes, cardiovascular disease, and coronary heart disease but a slightly higher risk of cancer mortality. Additionally, a 2023 meta-analysis of 19 trials containing overweight or obese individuals illustrated that ALA supplementation lowered triglycerides and systolic blood pressure.

== History ==
In 1887, linolenic acid was discovered and named by the Austrian chemist Karl Hazura of the Imperial Technical Institute at Vienna (although he did not separate its isomers). α-Linolenic acid was first isolated in pure form in 1909 by Ernst Erdmann and F. Bedford of the University of Halle an der Saale, Germany, and by Adolf Rollett of the Universität Berlin, Germany, working independently, as cited in J. W. McCutcheon's synthesis in 1942, and referred to in Green and Hilditch's 1930s survey. It was first artificially synthesized in 1995 from C6 homologating agents. A Wittig reaction of the phosphonium salt of [(Z-Z)-nona-3,6-dien-1-yl]triphenylphosphonium bromide with methyl 9-oxononanoate, followed by saponification, completed the synthesis.

== See also ==
- Canola oil
- Flax seed oil
- γ-Linolenic acid
- Drying oil
- Essential fatty acid
- List of n−3 fatty acids
- Essential nutrient
- Wheat germ oil
