= Chia seed =

Edible seeds of Salvia hispanica or related

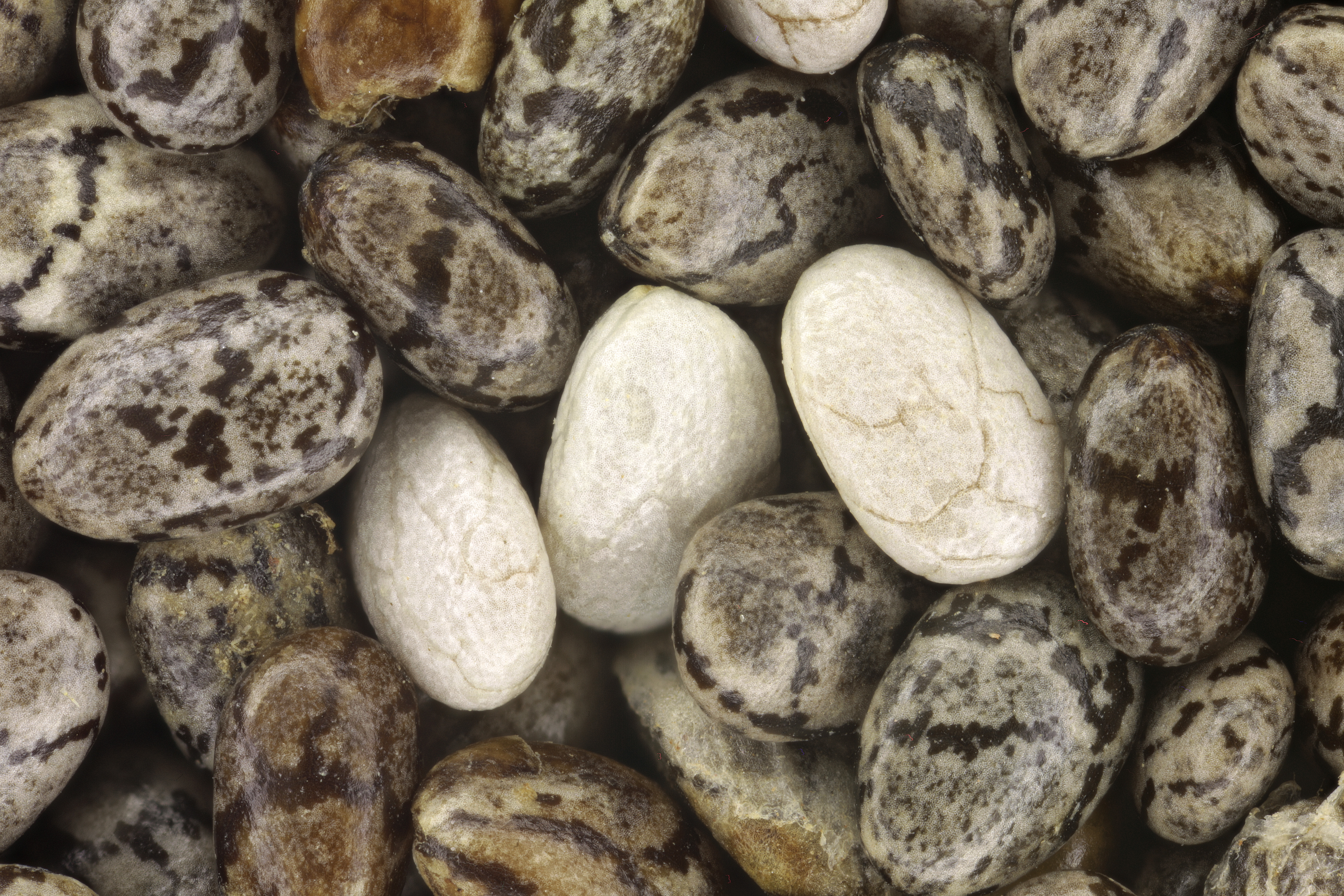
Color and detail of chia seeds close-up

Chia seeds (/tʃiːə/ CHEE-ə) are the edible seeds of Salvia hispanica, a flowering plant in the mint family (Lamiaceae) native to central and southern Mexico, or of the related Salvia columbariae, Salvia polystachia, or Salvia tiliifolia. Chia seeds are oval and gray with black and white spots, and have a diameter of around 1–2 millimetres (0.04–0.08 in). The seeds are hygroscopic, absorbing up to 12 times their weight in liquid when soaked and developing a mucilaginous coating that gives chia-based foods and beverages a distinctive gel texture.

There is evidence that the crop was widely cultivated by the Aztecs in pre-Columbian times and was a staple food for Mesoamerican cultures. Chia seeds are cultivated on a small scale in their ancestral homeland of central Mexico and Guatemala and commercially throughout Central and South America.

== Description ==
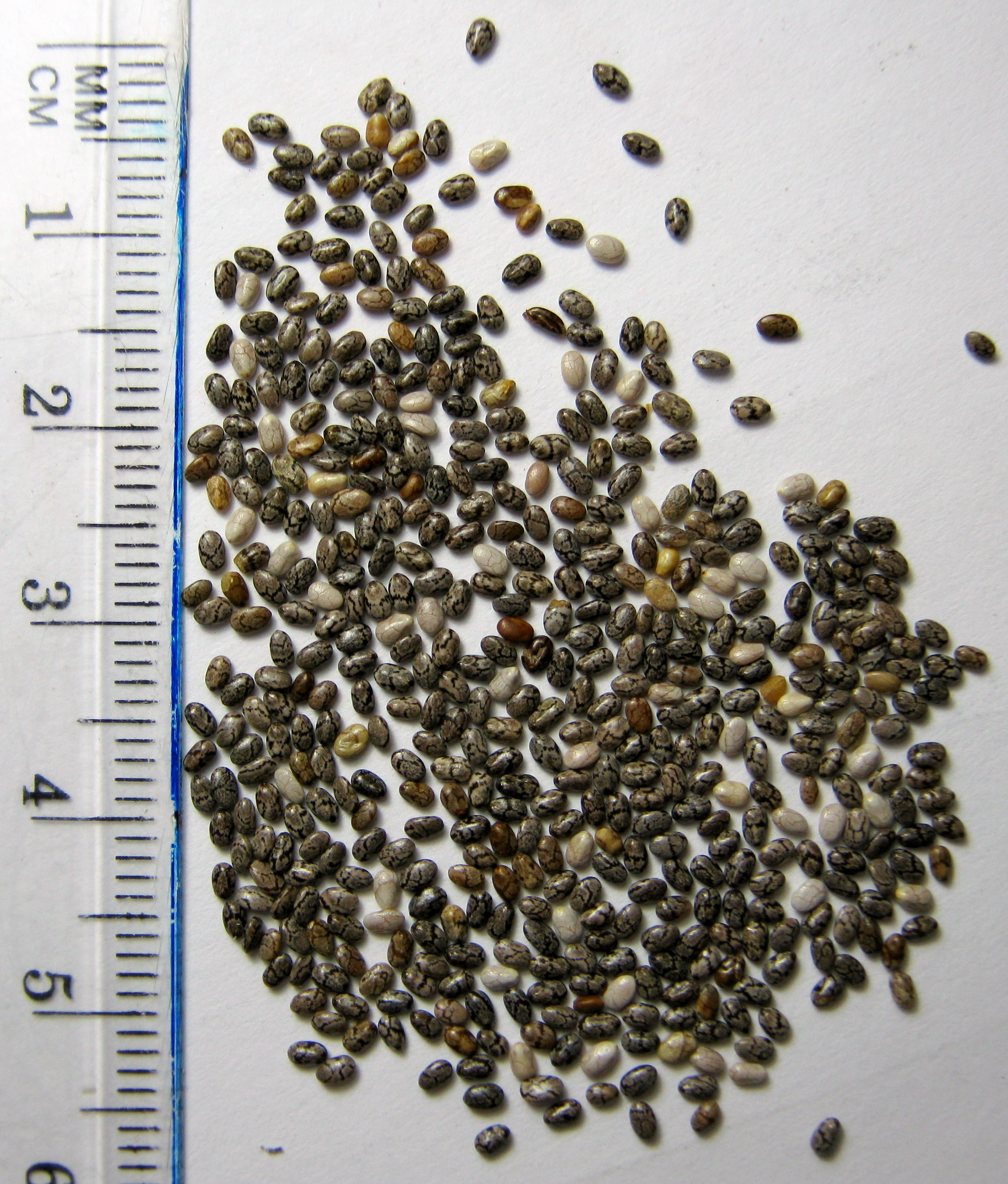
Chia seeds

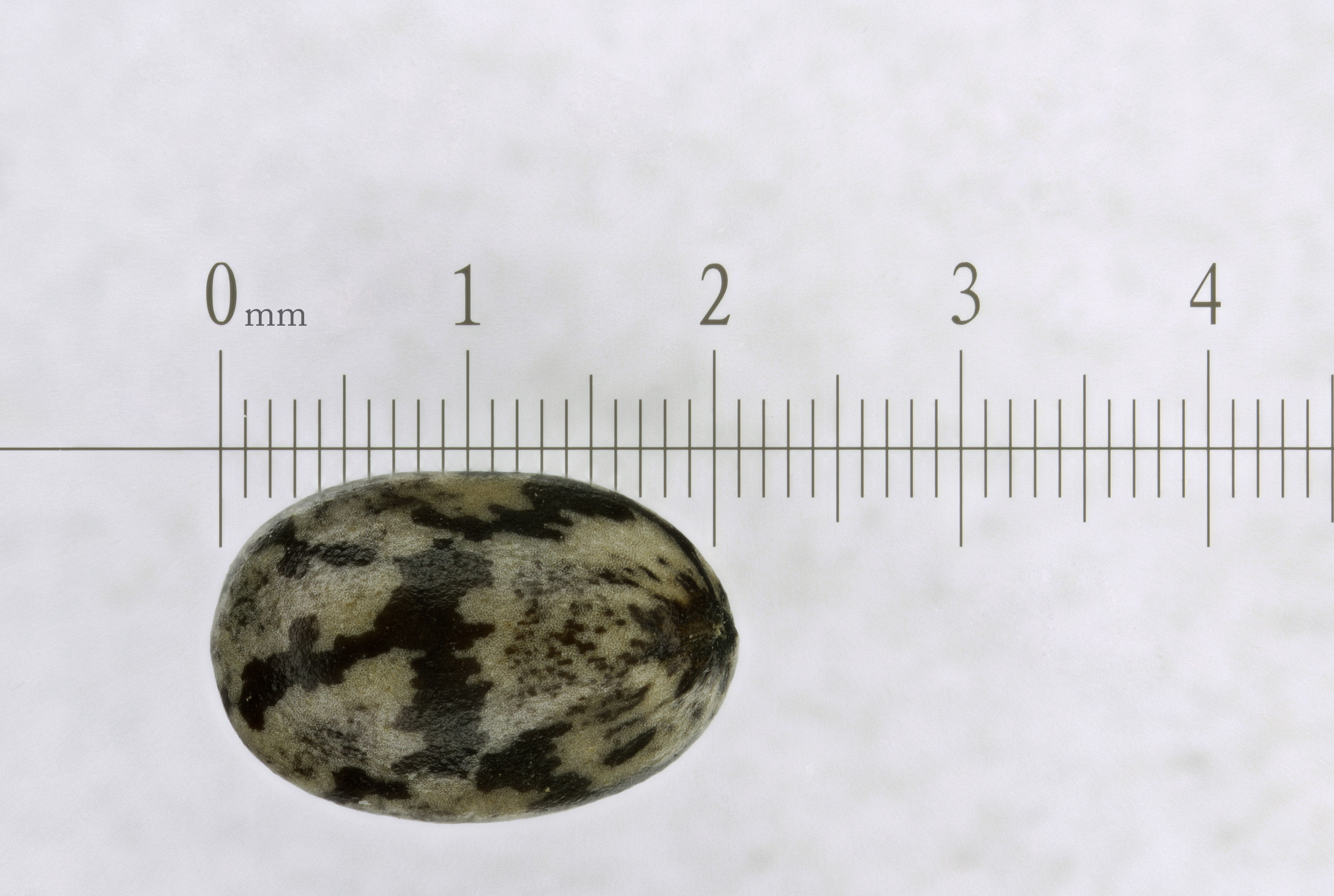
Chia seed measuring 2 mm

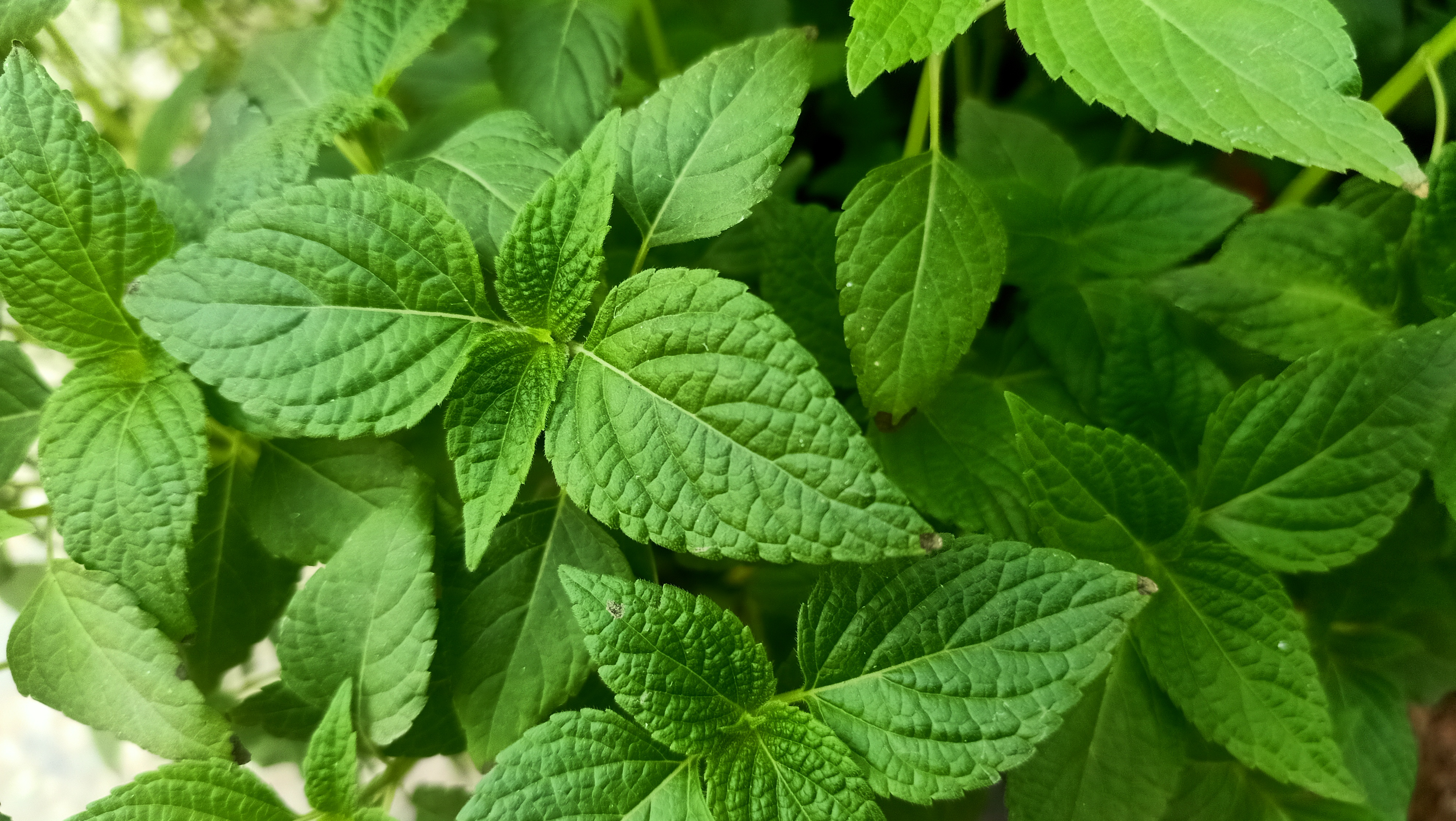
Leaves

Typically, chia seeds are small flattened ovoids measuring on average 2.1 mm × 1.3 mm × 0.8 mm (0.08 in × 0.05 in × 0.03 in), with an average weight of 1.3 mg per seed. They are mottle-colored with brown, gray, black, and white. The seeds are hygroscopic, absorbing up to 12 times their weight in liquid when soaked; they develop a mucilaginous coating that gives them a gel texture. Chia (or chian or chien) has mostly been identified as Salvia hispanica L. Other plants referred to as "chia" include "golden chia" (Salvia columbariae). The seeds of Salvia columbariae are also used for food.

== Modern cultivation ==
Seed yield varies depending on cultivars, mode of cultivation, and growing conditions by geographic region. For example, commercial fields in Argentina and Colombia vary in yield range from 450 to 1,250 kg/ha (400 to 1,120 lb/acre). A small-scale study with three cultivars grown in the inter-Andean valleys of Ecuador produced yields up to 2,300 kg/ha (2,100 lb/acre), indicating that favorable growing environment and cultivar interacted to produce such high yields.^{[20]} Genotype has a larger effect on yield than on protein content, oil content, fatty acid composition, or phenolic compounds, whereas high temperature reduces oil content and degree of unsaturation, and raises protein content.

== History ==
Salvia hispanica is described and pictured in the Codex Mendoza and the Florentine codex, Aztec codices created between 1540 and 1585. Tribute records from the Mendoza Codex, Matrícula de Tributos, and the Matricula de Huexotzinco (1560), along with colonial cultivation reports and linguistic studies, detail the geographic location of the tributes and provide some geographic specificity to the main S. hispanica-growing regions. Most of the provinces grew the plant, except for areas of lowland coastal tropics and desert, and it was given as an annual tribute by the people to the rulers in 21 of the 38 Aztec provincial states. The traditional cultivation area was in a distinct area that covered parts of north-central Mexico, south to Guatemala. A second and separate area of cultivation, apparently pre-Columbian, was in southern Honduras and Nicaragua.

Chia seeds served as a staple food for the Nahuatl (Aztec) cultures. It may have been as important as maize as a food crop. Jesuit chroniclers placed chia as the third-most important crop in the Aztec culture, behind only corn and beans, and ahead of amaranth. Offerings to the Aztec priesthood were often paid in chia seed.

In the 21st century, chia is grown and consumed commercially in its native Mexico and Guatemala, as well as Bolivia, Argentina, Ecuador, Nicaragua, Australia, the United Kingdom and the United States. New patented varieties of chia have been developed in Kentucky for cultivation in northern latitudes of the United States.

== Nutrition ==
Dried chia seeds contain 6% water, 42% carbohydrates (including a high content of dietary fiber), 16% protein, and 31% fat (table). In a reference amount of 100 grams (3.5 oz), chia seeds supply 486 calories and are a rich source (20% or more of the Daily Value, DV) of the B vitamins thiamin and niacin (52% and 55% DV, respectively). They are also a moderate source of riboflavin (13% DV) and folate (12% DV). The seeds contain dense amounts of several dietary minerals, including calcium, iron, magnesium, manganese, phosphorus, and zinc (all more than 20% DV; table).

Chia oil contains a high percentage of essential fatty acids (approximately 60%) and a low content of saturated fatty acids. The fats of chia seed oil are mainly unsaturated, with linoleic acid (17–26% of total fat) and α-linolenic acid (50–57%) as the major fatty acids (see table).

Chia seeds, dried, raw
Nutritional value per 100 g (3.5 oz)
- Energy: 486 kcal (2,030 kJ)
- Carbohydrates: 42.1 g
- Dietary fiber: 34.4 g
- Fat: 30.7 g
- Saturated: 3.3 g
- Monounsaturated: 2.3 g
- Polyunsaturated omega−3 omega−6: 23.7 g 17.8 g 5.8 g
- Protein: 16.5 g
Vitamins and minerals
| Vitamins | Quantity %DV^{†} |
| Vitamin A equiv. | 6% 54 μg |
| Thiamine (B1) | 52% 0.62 mg |
| Riboflavin (B2) | 13% 0.17 mg |
| Niacin (B3) | 55% 8.83 mg |
| Folate (B9) | 12% 49 μg |
| Vitamin C | 2% 1.6 mg |
| Vitamin E | 3% 0.5 mg |
| Minerals | Quantity %DV^{†} |
| Calcium | 49% 631 mg |
| Iron | 43% 7.7 mg |
| Magnesium | 80% 335 mg |
| Manganese | 118% 2.72 mg |
| Phosphorus | 69% 860 mg |
| Potassium | 14% 407 mg |
| Zinc | 42% 4.6 mg |
- Other constituents: Quantity
- Water: 5.8 g
- Link to USDA Database entry
- ^{†}Percentages estimated using US recommendations for adults, except for potassium, which is estimated based on expert recommendation from the National Academies.

== As food ==
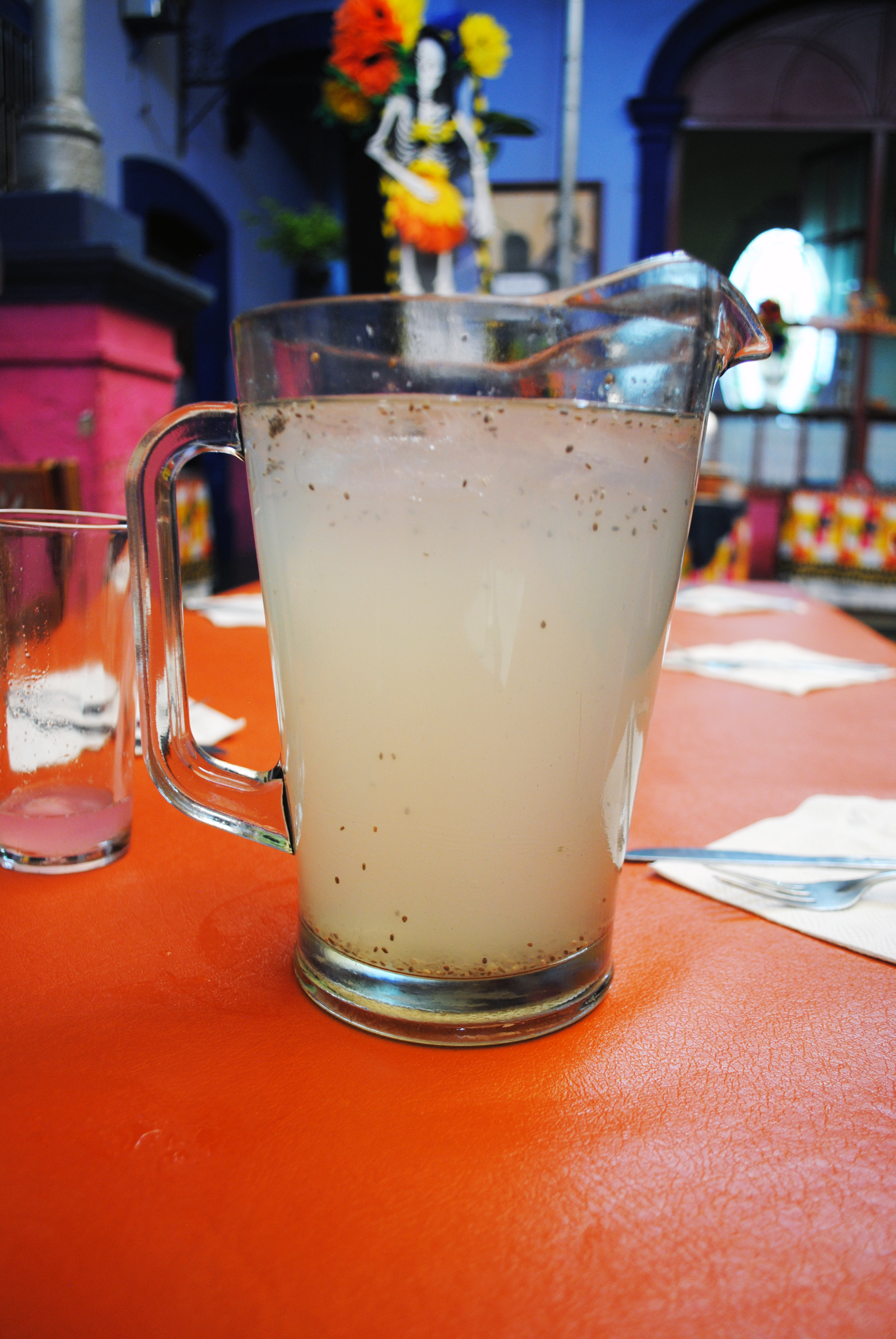
Mexican agua fresca made using chía

Chia seeds may be added to other foods as a topping or put into smoothies, breakfast cereals, energy bars, granola bars, yogurt, tortillas, and bread.

They also may be made into a gelatin-like substance or consumed raw. The gel from ground seeds may be used in place of eggs in baking, and it is a common substitute in vegan and allergen-free baking.

Chia seeds can also be used to create a pudding-like dessert if the seeds are mixed with a flavored liquid and left in the fridge overnight. The chia seeds absorb water from the liquid to create a gelatinous outer layer. It is typically made by leaving the seeds to soak in a liquid base overnight.

=== In Europe ===
Chia is considered a novel food in Europe because it does not have "a significant history of consumption within the European Union before 15 May 1997", according to the Advisory Committee of Novel Foods and Processes. Under this rule, chia seeds may be 5% of total matter in bread products. Prepackaged chia seeds must carry additional labelling to inform the consumer that the daily intake is no more than 15 grams and pure chia oil only 2 grams daily.

Chia seeds sold in the EU are imported mainly from South American and Central American countries and require inspections for levels of pesticides, contaminants, and microbiological criteria.

=== Preliminary health research ===
Preliminary research remains sparse and inconclusive. In a 2015 systematic review, most of the studies did not show an effect of chia seed consumption on cardiovascular risk factors in humans.

=== Drug interactions ===
No evidence to date indicates consuming chia seeds has adverse effects on, or interacts with, prescription drugs.

== In popular culture ==
=== Chia pet ===
Introduced in 1977, chia pet figurines were used to sprout chia, becoming novelties as house plants with about 15 million sold, as of 2019.

== Gallery ==
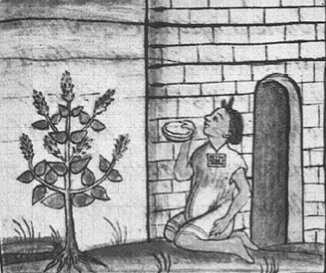
Drawing from the Florentine Codex showing a S. hispanica plant

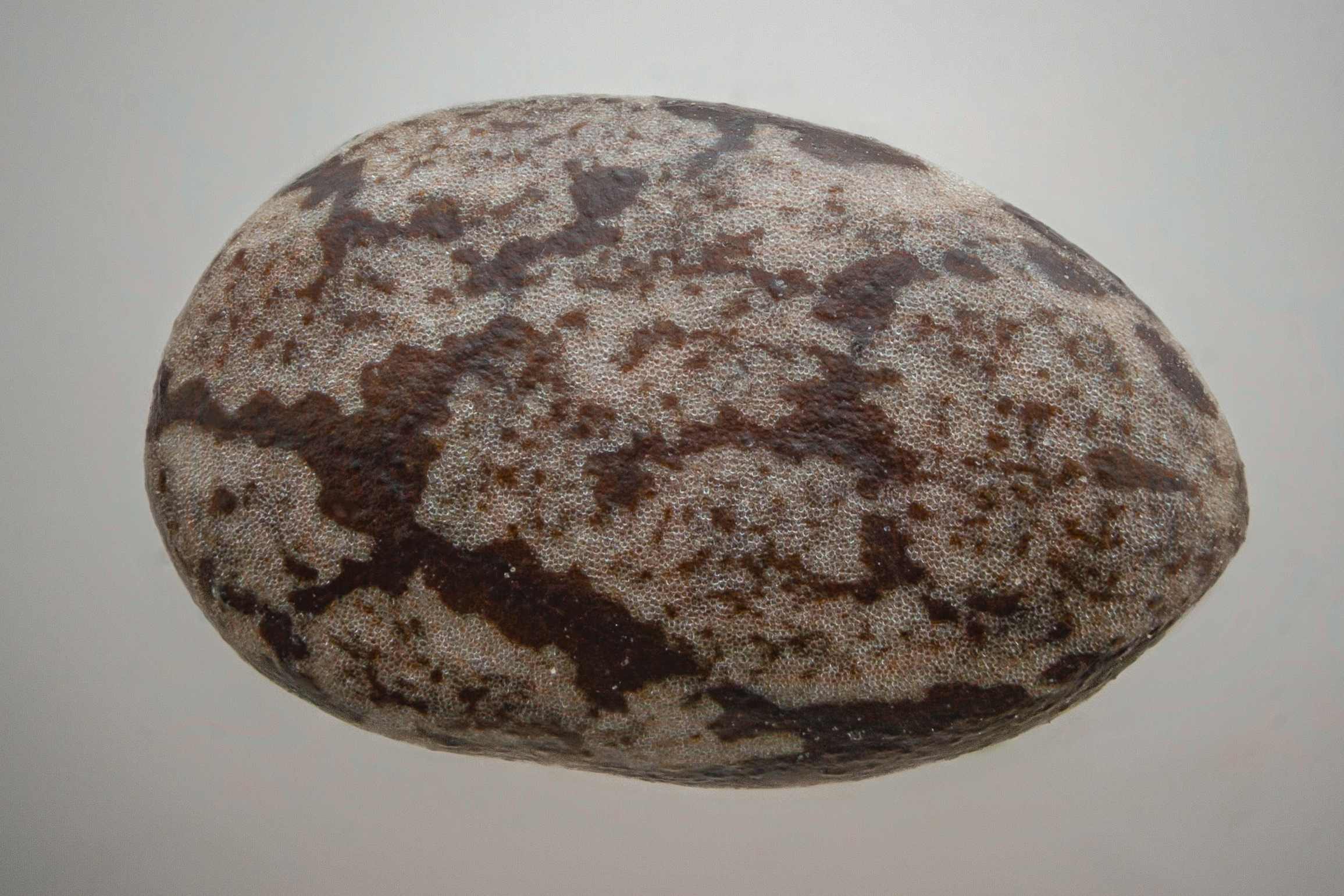
An extreme macro photograph of a chia seed

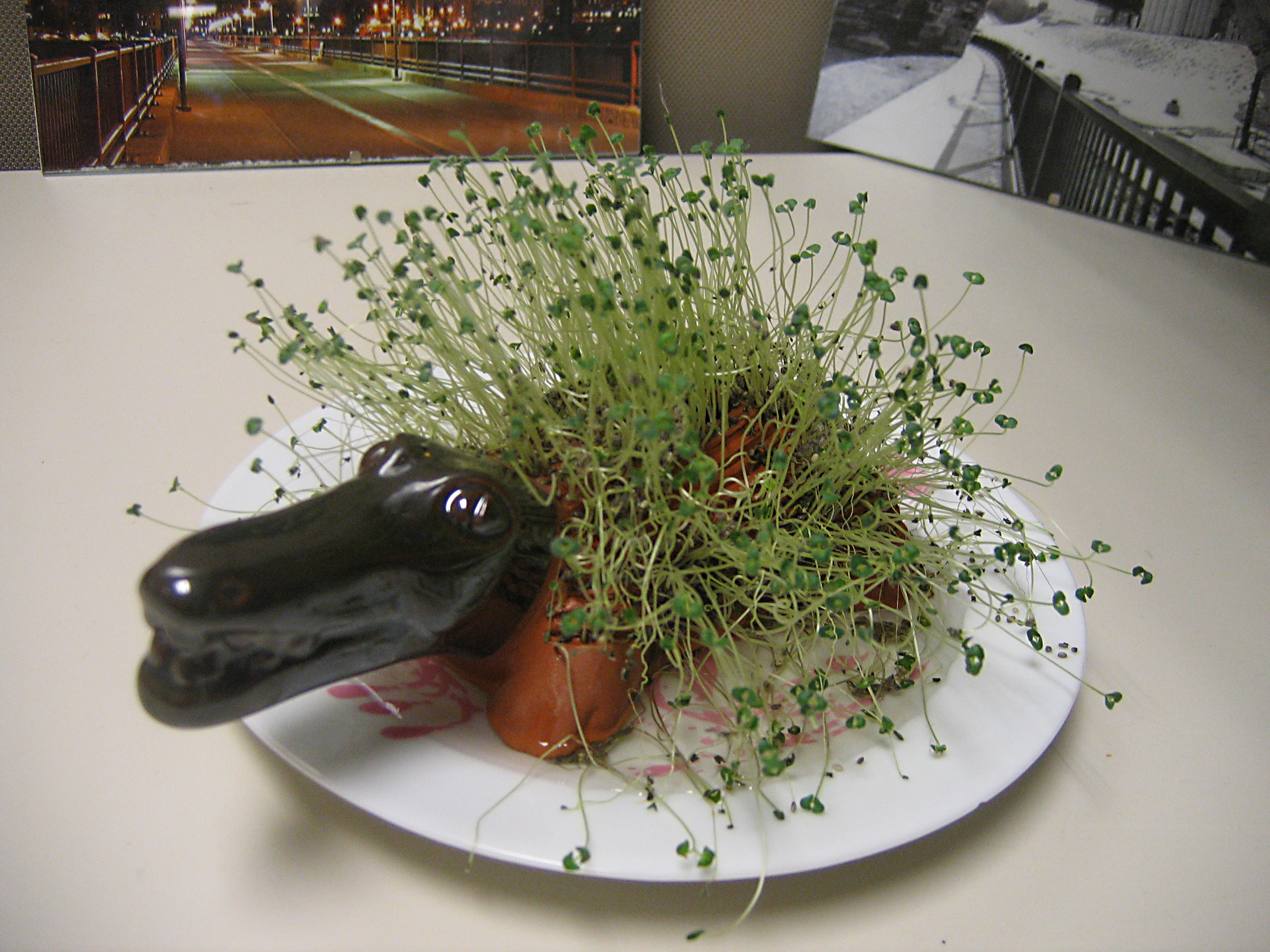
Chia pet alligator

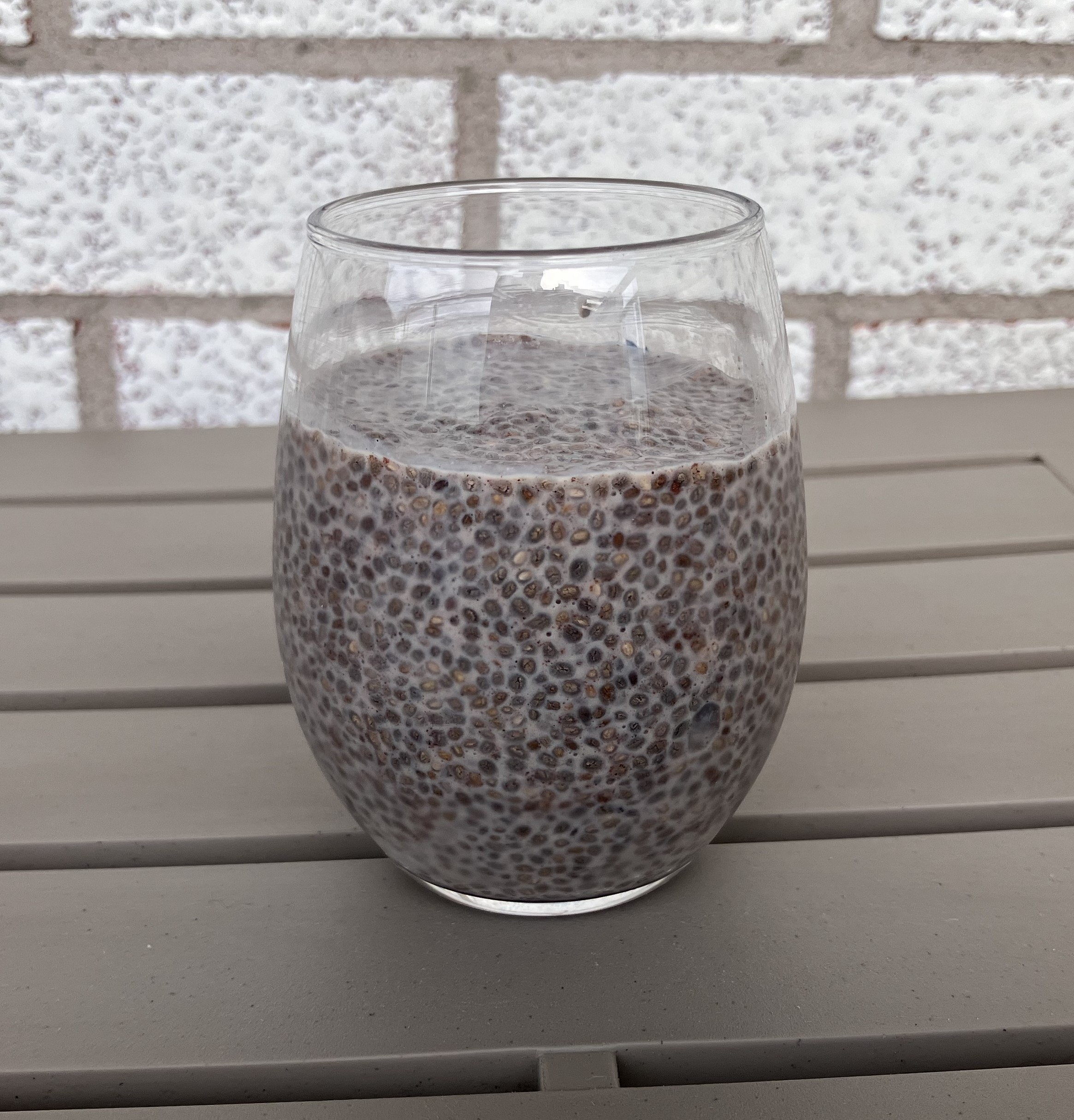
Pudding made from chia seeds
