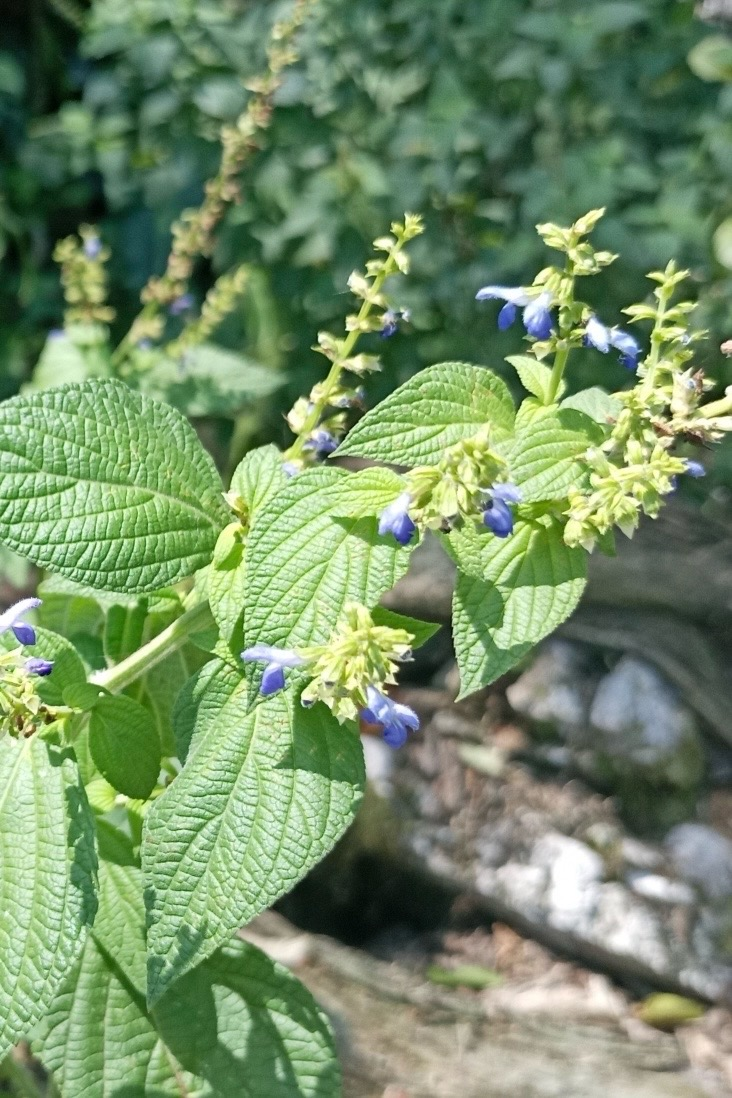

Scientific classification
- Kingdom: Plantae
- Clade: Tracheophytes
- Clade: Angiosperms
- Clade: Eudicots
- Clade: Asterids
- Order: Lamiales
- Family: Lamiaceae
- Genus: Salvia
- Species: S. xalapensis

Binomial name
- Salvia xalapensis Benth.

Synonyms
- Salvia cordobensis Briq.; Salvia polystachya M.Martens & Galeotti, nom. illeg.

= Salvia xalapensis =

Species of plant

Salvia xalapensis is a species of flowering plant in the family Lamiaceae, native to Mexico. Compounds obtained from Salvia xalapensis have been investigated for their possible medical or insecticidal uses.

== Taxonomy ==
Salvia xalapensis was first described by George Bentham in 1848. In 1844, Martin Martens and Henri Guillaume Galeotti published the name Salvia polystachya. As of May 2024, Plants of the World Online regarded this as an illegitimate synonym of Salvia xalapensis. In 1791, Antonio José Cavanilles had described a different species as Salvia polystachia (also spelt Salvia polystachya.)

== Phytochemistry ==
Salvia xalapensis is one of a number of Salvia species whose phytochemistry has been investigated, for taxonomic reasons and to study the biological activity of the compounds present, which might have medical or insecticidal uses. Four new diterpenes were among the 13 different compounds isolated from three populations of Salvia xalapensis. Two of the diterpenes had a novel molecular skeleton. An in vitro study showed that the diterpene salvixalapadiene obtained from Salvia xalapensis had potential as an insecticide against Drosophila melanogaster.
