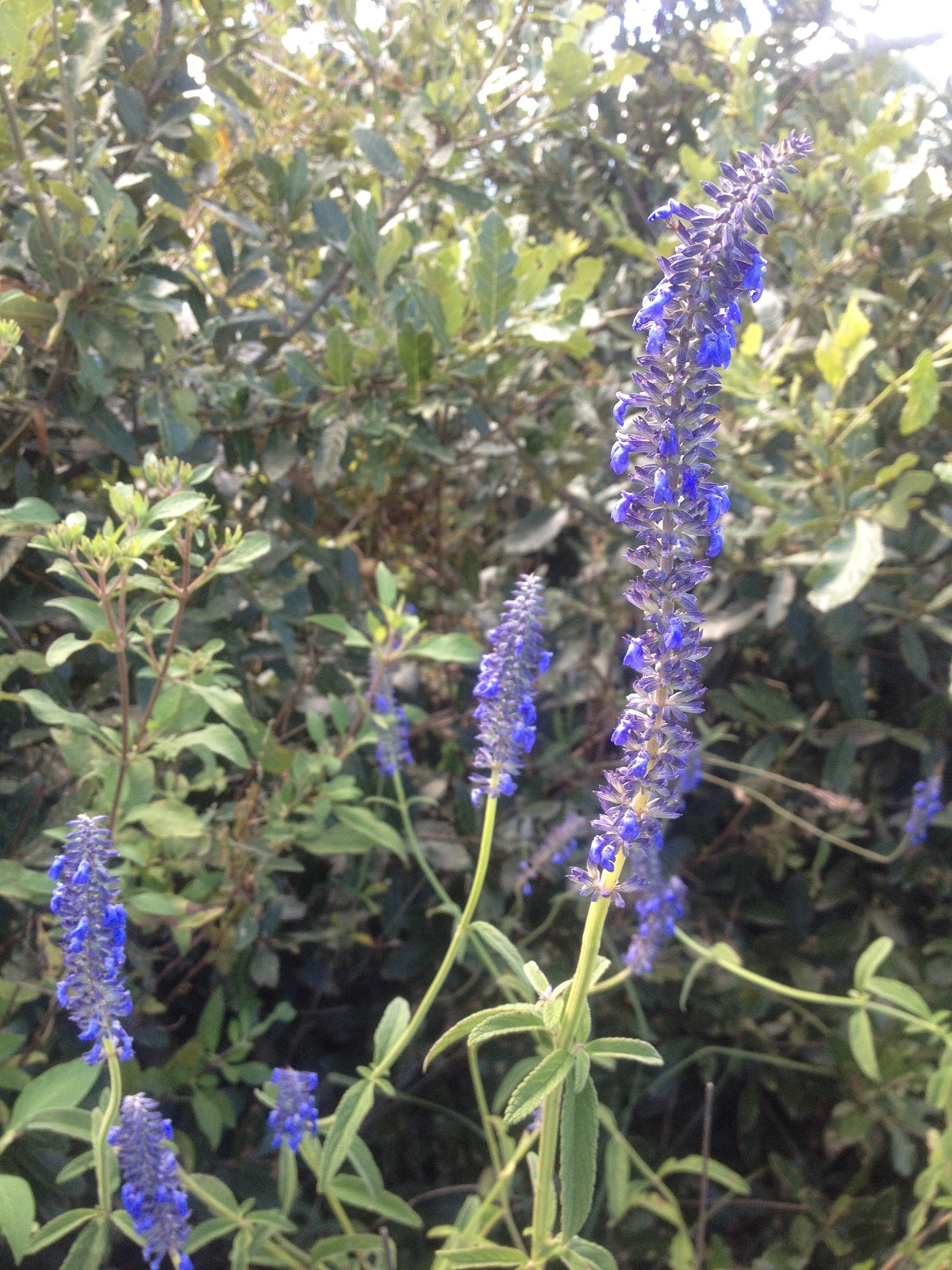
- Near Popocatépetl

Scientific classification
- Kingdom: Plantae
- Clade: Tracheophytes
- Clade: Angiosperms
- Clade: Eudicots
- Clade: Asterids
- Order: Lamiales
- Family: Lamiaceae
- Genus: Salvia
- Species: S. lavanduloides

Binomial name
- Salvia lavanduloides Kunth

Synonyms
- Salvia fratrum Standl.; Salvia humboldtiana Schult.; Salvia lavanduloides var. hispida Benth.; Salvia lavanduloides var. latifolia Benth.; Salvia purpurina La Llave

= Salvia lavanduloides =

Species of plant

Salvia lavanduloides, the lavender leaf sage, is a species of flowering plant in the family Lamiaceae, native to Mexico, Guatemala, Honduras, and Costa Rica. Found in montane forests, it is fire-adapted.
