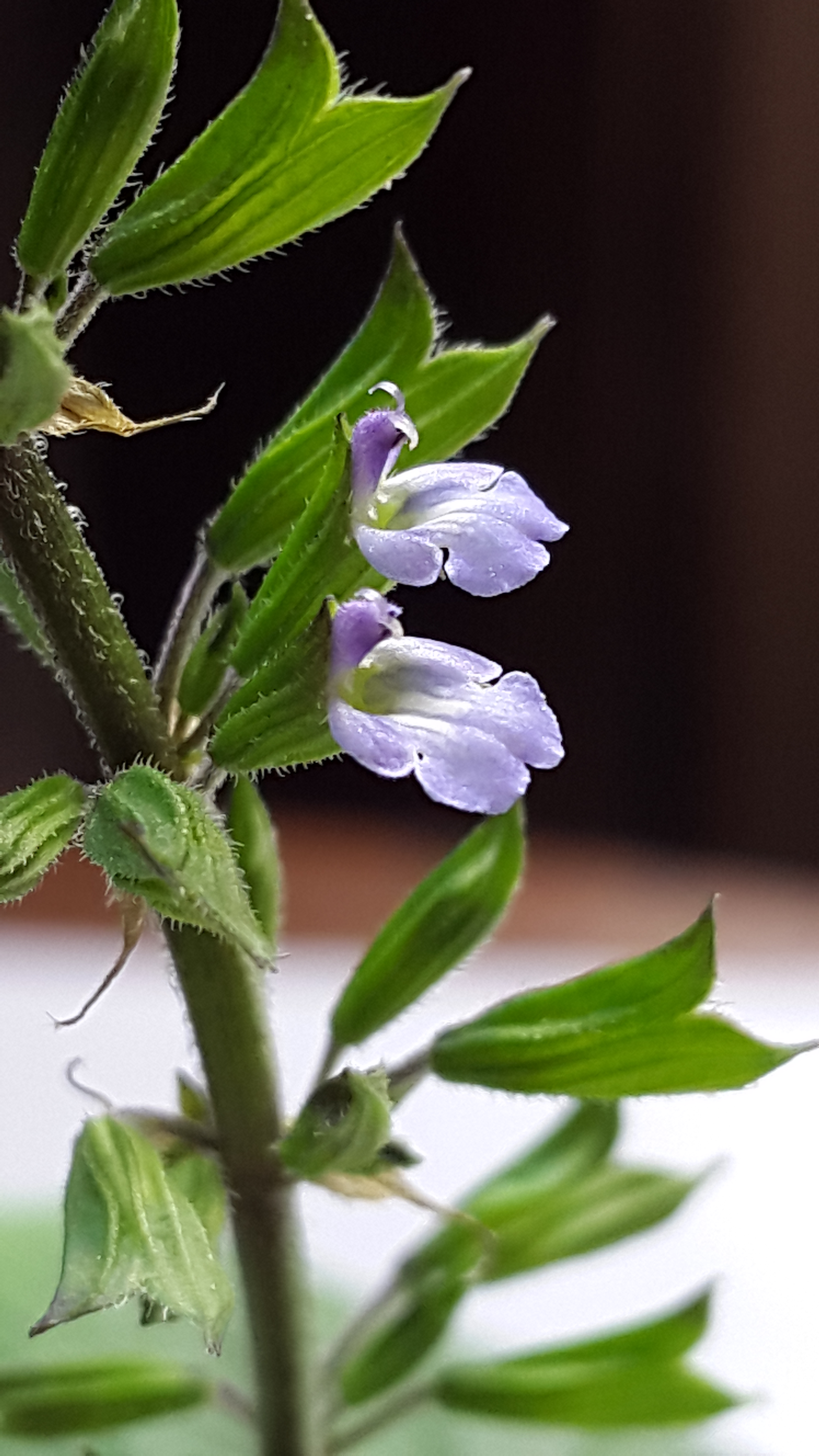

Scientific classification
- Kingdom: Plantae
- Clade: Tracheophytes
- Clade: Angiosperms
- Clade: Eudicots
- Clade: Asterids
- Order: Lamiales
- Family: Lamiaceae
- Genus: Salvia
- Species: S. tiliifolia

Binomial name
- Salvia tiliifolia Vahl

Synonyms
- Salvia tilaefolia Vahl

= Salvia tiliifolia =

Species of flowering plant

Salvia tiliifolia (lindenleaf sage or Tarahumara chia) is a vigorous, herbaceous annual in the family Lamiaceae that is native to Central America. As a pioneer of abused areas, the plant has spread in modern times into: South America, as far south as Peru and Bolivia; the southwestern regions of the United States, including the states Texas and Arizona; Africa, including South Africa and Ethiopia; China, including the provinces of Yunnan and Sichuan.

This species is native to Mesoamerica, and a number of similar species have been domesticated at least as far back as 3,400 BCE. Chia was an important item in the Aztec diet and was widely used by them. Salvia tiliifolia is still harvested by the Tarahumara. The Aztecs roasted chia seed mixed with amaranth seed, corn flour, and maguey syrup to form a dough referred to as "tzoalli" in Nahuatl—routinely eaten and still consumed. The roasted seeds were also ground into flour, and formed the main ingredient of a drink known as "chianatolli." The roasted seeds are also added to a drink known as "chia fresca" by the Tarahumara. When chia seeds are soaked, they exude a thick mucilage. "Chia" translates to "strength" from Mayan, and is prized as an energy-laden food. It contains large amounts of Omega-3 fatty acids, as well as iron, calcium, and anti-oxidants. Its energy is slowly released during the digestive process, which breaks down carbohydrates, and converts them to sugar. The Tarahumara attribute their long-distance running prowess to chia.

Salvia tiliifolia grows up to 1 m (3.3 ft) tall. Its leaves are characterized by the following features: an ovate shape with petiolate blades; size ranges of 5 to 10 cm (2.0 to 3.9 in) long, and 4 to 9 cm (1.6 to 3.5 in) wide; surfaces that are slightly pubescent; veins that are deeply recessed on the upper surface and exserted on the lower; margins that finely and regularly crenate; and bearing a strong resemblance to those of the Tilia or linden tree. The inflorescence can be simple or paniculate, with a hispid, ribbed calyx. The dark blue corolla is 5 to 10 mm (0.20 to 0.39 in) long. It is morphologically similar to Salvia personata. Seeds are small, dark, and patterned.

The plant has spread to many countries, and commonly grows in cultivated fields. First described as Salvia tiliaefolia by the botanist Martin Henrichsen Vahl in 1794, Salvia tiliifolia has become naturalised or invasive in Mexico, the United States, Ethiopia (1980s), South Africa (1943), and China (1990s). Its foothold in Ethiopia resulted from its presence in grains that were distributed as part of humanitarian aid programs that followed prolonged droughts. Since then, the species has spread rapidly, and has replaced native herbs in some sites. The plants uncontrolled expansion in Ethiopia is partly due to it being strongly aromatic, and is thus shunned by grazing and browsing animals.

== Gallery ==
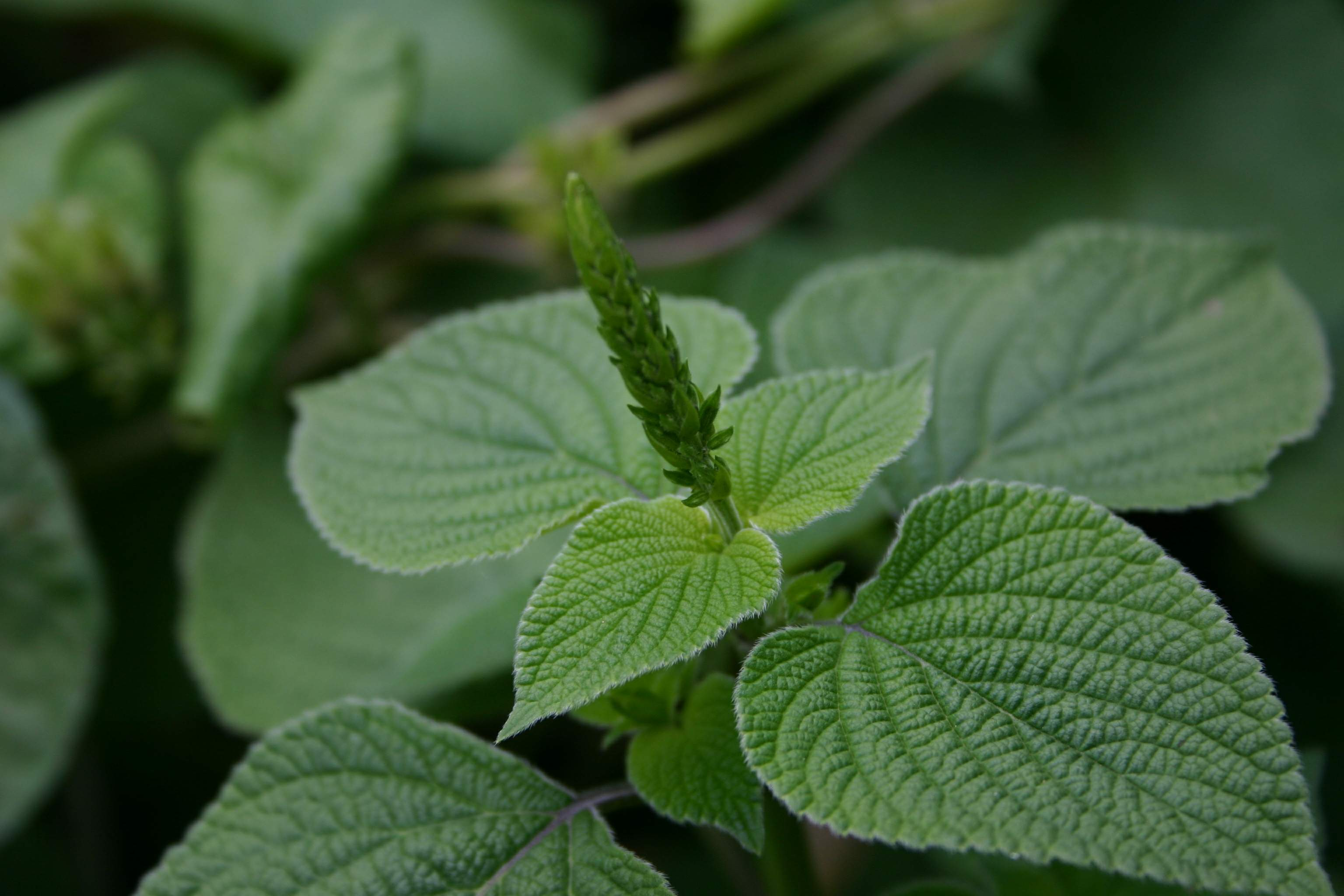
Foliage and flower spike

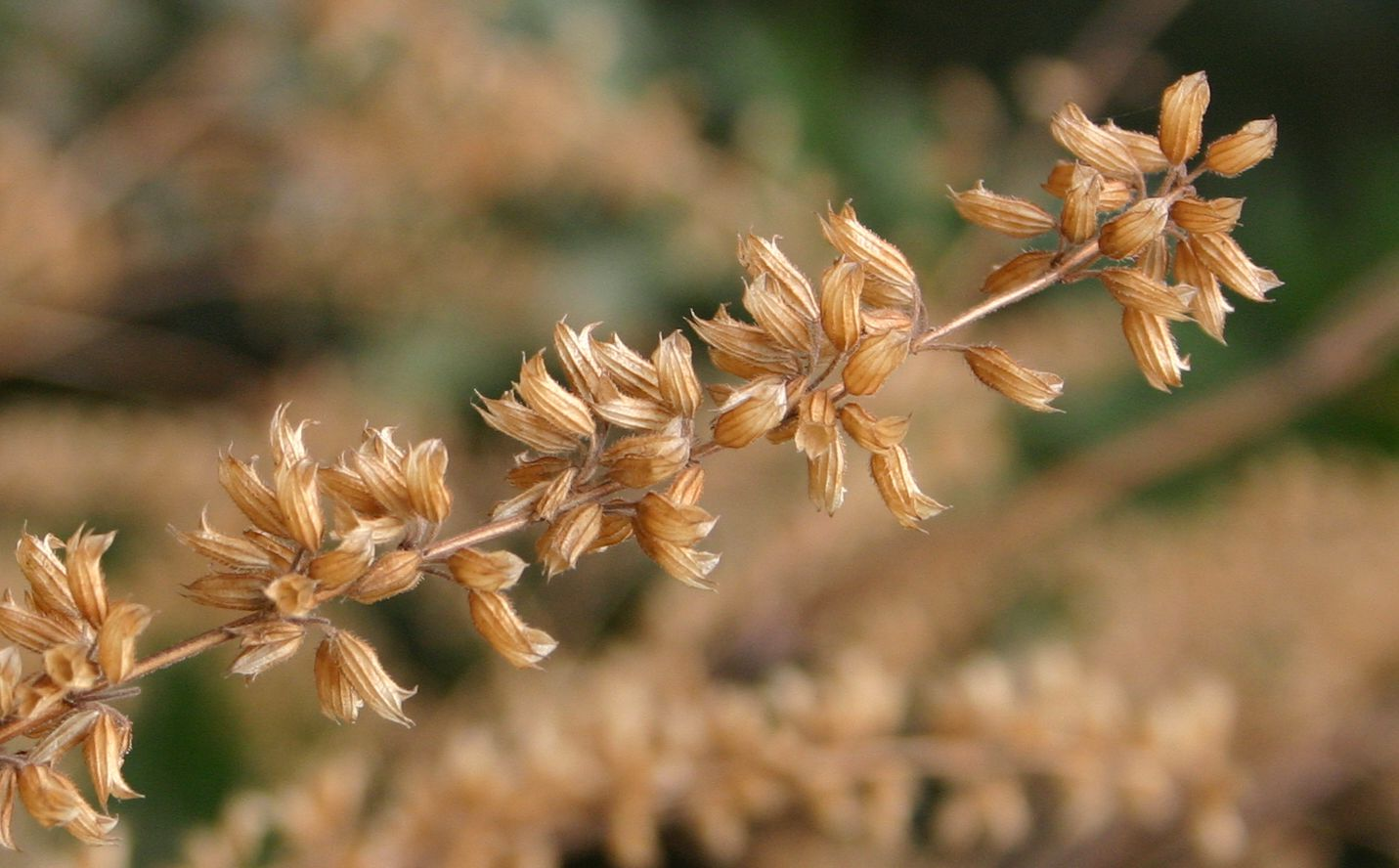
Persistent calyces

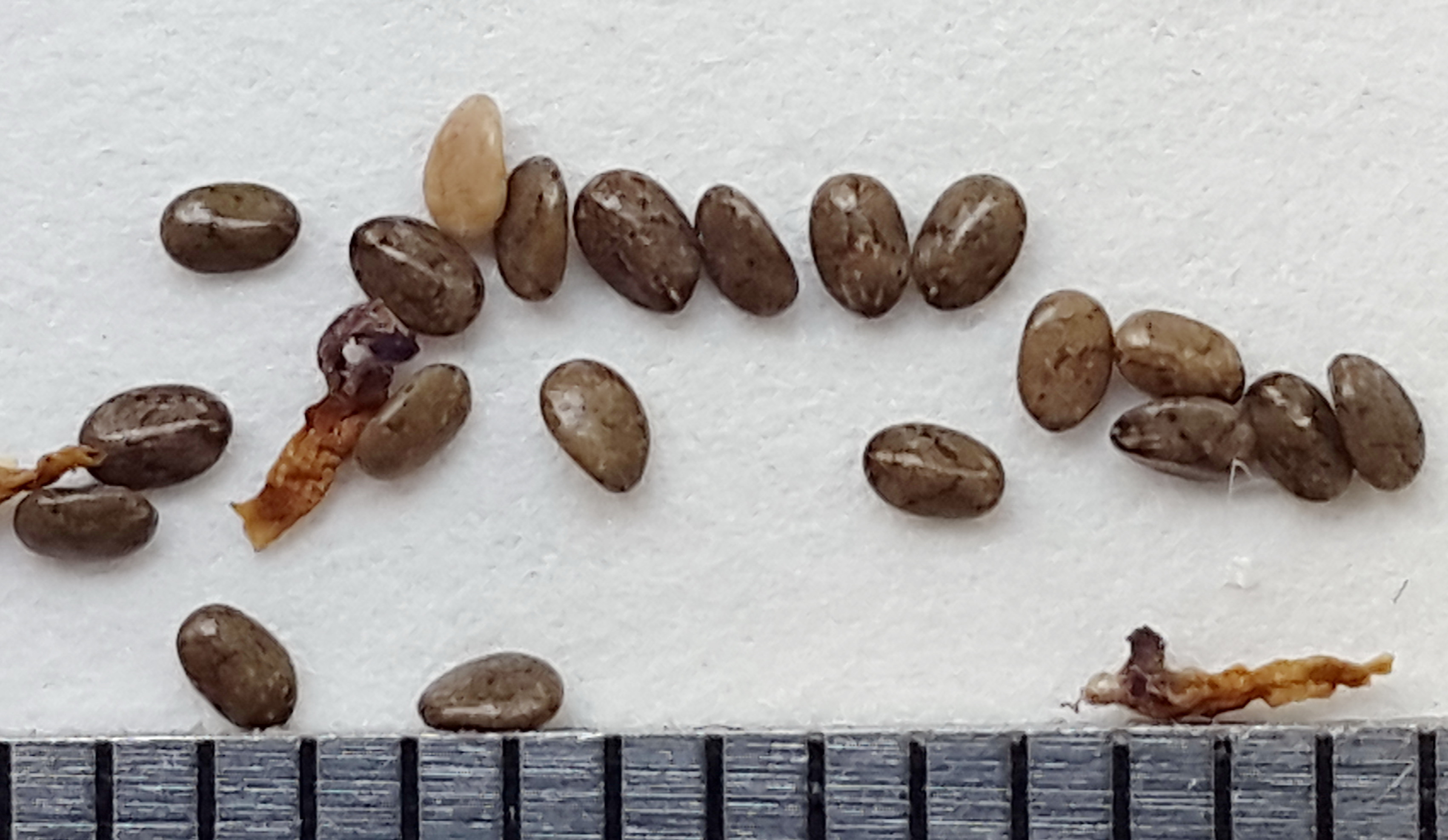
Seeds
