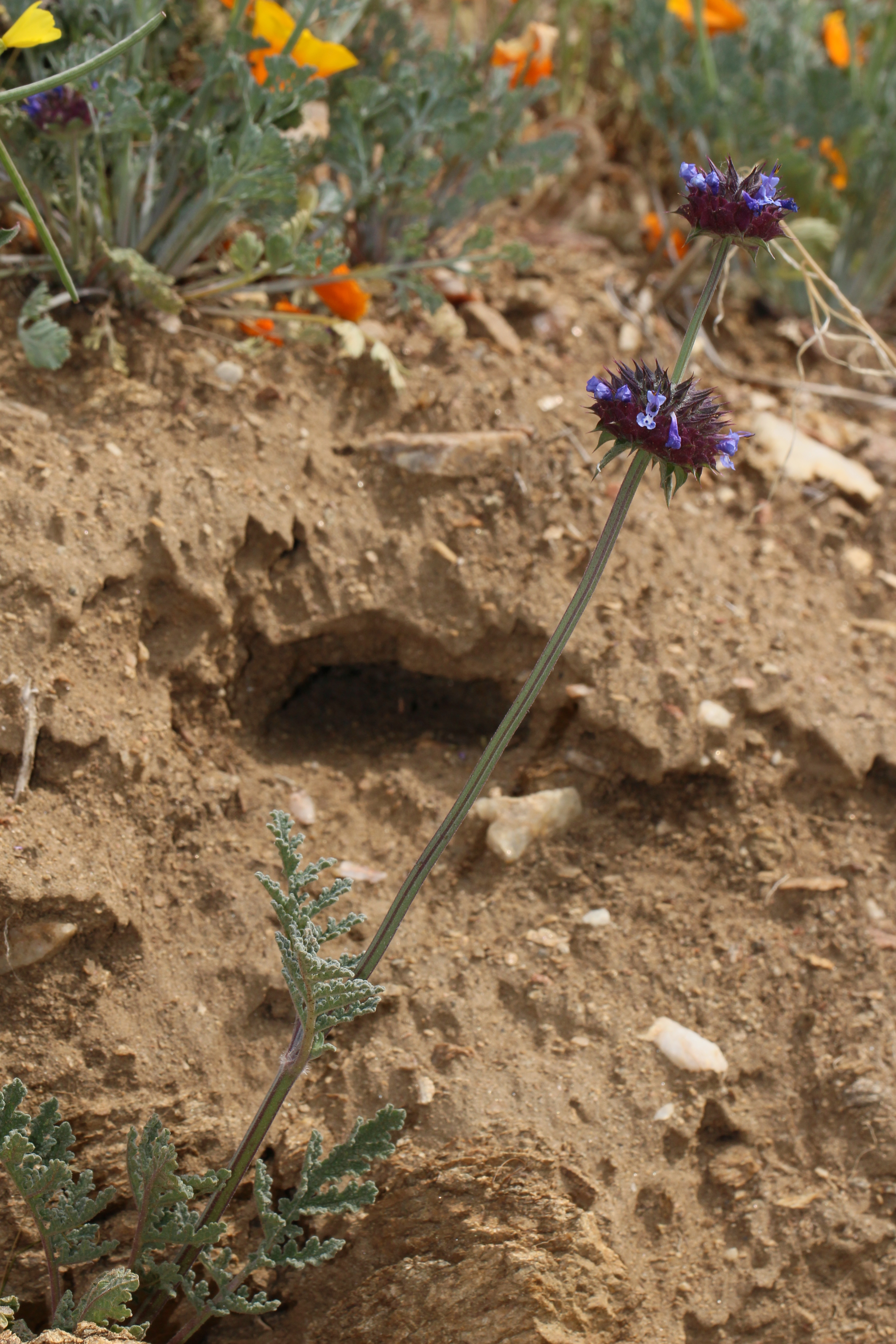

Conservation status
- Secure (NatureServe)

Scientific classification
- Kingdom: Plantae
- Clade: Tracheophytes
- Clade: Angiosperms
- Clade: Eudicots
- Clade: Asterids
- Order: Lamiales
- Family: Lamiaceae
- Genus: Salvia
- Species: S. columbariae

Binomial name
- Salvia columbariae Benth.

= Salvia columbariae =

Species of flowering plant

Salvia columbariae is an annual plant that is commonly called chia, chia sage, golden chia, or desert chia, because its seeds are used in the same way as those of Salvia hispanica (chia). It grows in California, Nevada, Utah, Arizona, New Mexico, Sonora, and Baja California, and is an important food for Native Americans. Some native names include pashiiy from Tongva and it'epeš from Ventureño.

== Description ==
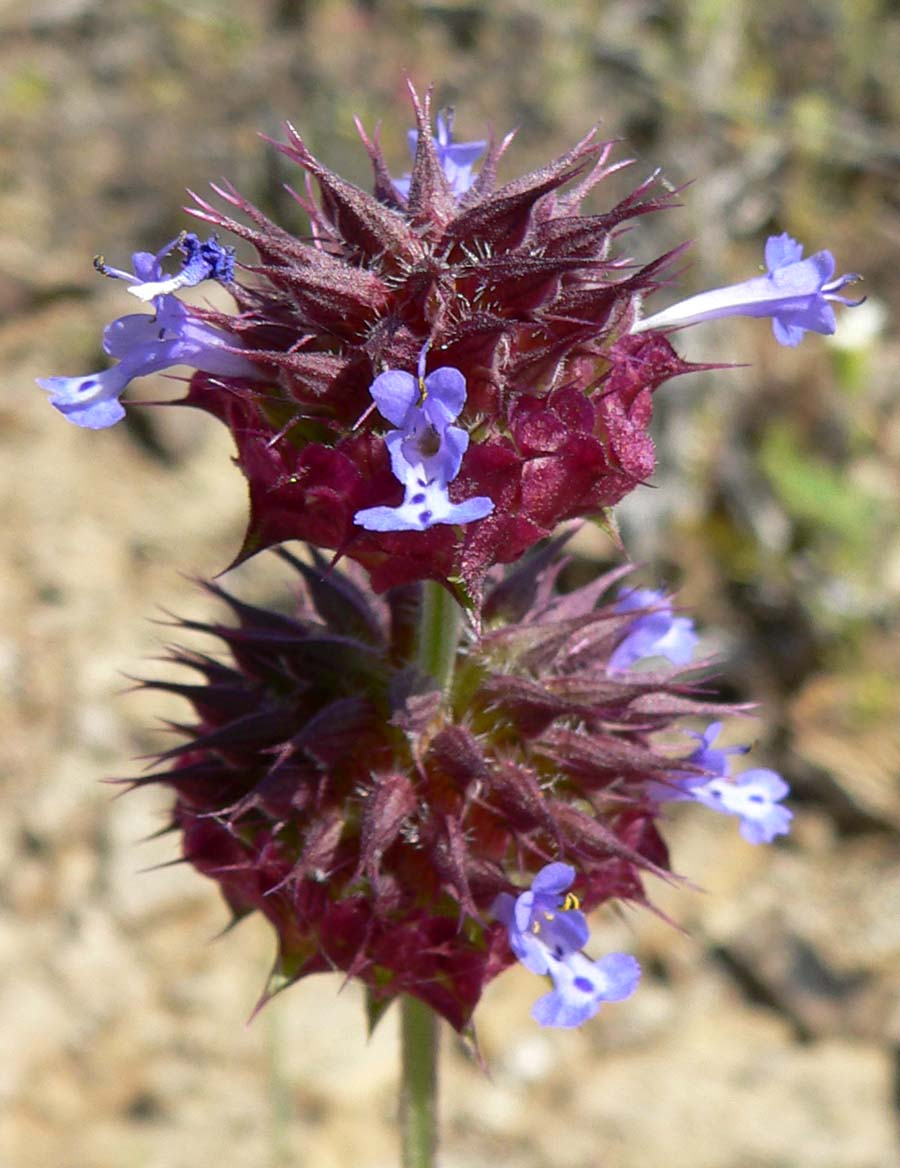
The inflorescence usually consists of one or two clusters. Bracts are about 10 mm (0.39 in), more or less round and tipped with an awn (bristle).

Salvia columbariae grows 10 to 50 cm (3.9 to 19.7 in) tall. Its stem hairs are generally short and sparse in distribution. It has oblong-ovate basal leaves that are 2 to 10 cm (0.79 to 3.94 in) long. The leaves are pinnately dissected and the lobes are irregularly rounded. The inflorescence is more or less scapose, meaning it has a long peduncle that comes from the ground level that has bracts. The bracts are round and awn-tipped. There are usually 1 or 2 clusters of flowers within the inflorescence. The calyx is 8 to 10 mm (0.31 to 0.39 in) long and the upper lip is unlobed but has 2 (sometimes 3) awns. The lower lip is about twice the size of the upper lip. The flower color can be pale blue to blue and purple tipped. The stamens of the plant are slightly exserted. The fruit of S. columbariae is a nutlet that is tan to grey in color and 1.5 to 2 mm (0.059 to 0.079 in) long.

== Varieties ==
- Salvia columbariae var. columbariae Benth. – California sage, chia
- Salvia columbariae var. ziegleri Munz – Ziegler's sage

== Habitat ==
Salvia columbariae can be found in dry undisturbed sites, chaparral, and coastal sage scrub. It generally grows at elevations lower than 2,500 m (8,200 ft). In cultivation, it prefers good drainage, sun, and dry weather.

== Uses ==
=== Medicinal uses ===
The Cahuilla used the columbariae Benth. variety as a disinfectant by grinding the seeds to mush and applying it to infections as a poultice. The Cahuilla, Ohlone, Kawaiisu, and Mahuna used the gelatinous seeds to cleanse out foreign matter in the eyes. The seeds were placed in the eyes for infections and inflammation, and during sleep, they were tucked underneath the eyelids to remove sand particles. The Ohlone also used it to reduce fevers by consuming the seeds, and the Kumeyaay chewed the seeds on journeys by foot to give strength.

=== Food ===
The Cahuilla, Kawaiisu, Mohave, Tohono O'odham, Chumash, and Akimel O'odham grind the seeds and mix them into water to make a thick beverage. The Cahuillas removed the alkali salts in the water, improving the flavor. They also dry the seeds to make cakes or mush. The Ohlones, Mohave, and Pomo make pinole. The Kumeyaay added the seeds to wheat to improve flavor. The Mahuna, Paiute, and Akimel O'odham make it into a gelatinous material, then cook it into porridge. The Luiseno, Tubatulabal, and Yavapai used it extensively as a food source.

=== Building material ===
The Mahuna made it into a fiber and covered their dwellings with it.
