= ELOVL5 =

Protein-coding gene in the species Homo sapiens

Identifiers
- Aliases: ELOVL5, HELO1, SCA38, dJ483K16.1, ELOVL fatty acid elongase 5
- External IDs: OMIM: 611805; MGI: 1916051; GeneCards: ELOVL5
Enzyme activity
EC #	BRENDA	ExPASy	KEGG	MetaCyc
2.3.1.199	↗	↗	↗	↗

Gene location (Human)
Chr.	Chromosome 6 (human)
Band	6p12.1	Start	53,267,398 bp
Band	6p12.1	End	53,349,179 bp

Gene location (Mouse)
Chr.	Chromosome 9 (mouse)
Band	9|9 E1	Start	77,824,646 bp
Band	9|9 E1	End	77,891,801 bp
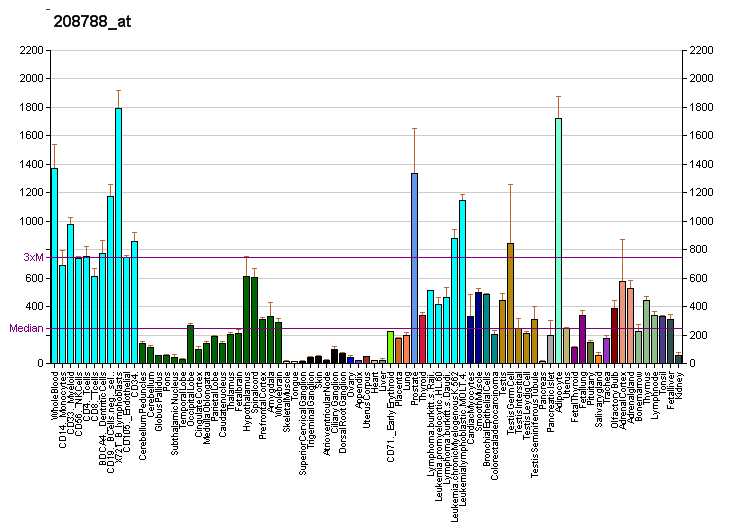

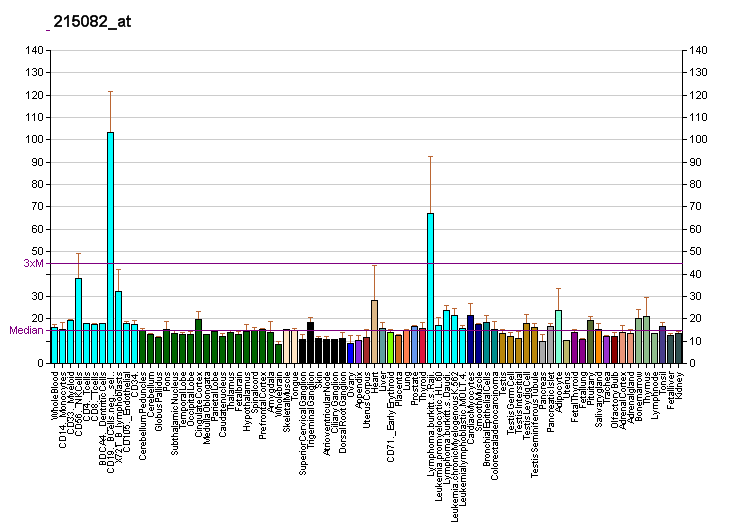
RNA expression pattern
Bgee	Human / Mouse (ortholog); Top expressed in: seminal vesicula; secondary oocyte; lactiferous duct; tibia; skin of thigh; trigeminal ganglion; parietal pleura; epithelium of nasopharynx; spinal ganglia; inferior ganglion of vagus nerve / Top expressed in: vestibular membrane of cochlear duct; Paneth cell; carotid body; cumulus cell; conjunctival fornix; adrenal gland; facial motor nucleus; substantia nigra; stria vascularis; anterior horn of spinal cord; More reference expression data
BioGPS	More reference expression data
Gene ontology
Molecular function	protein binding; transferase activity; 3-oxo-arachidoyl-CoA synthase activity; 3-oxo-cerotoyl-CoA synthase activity; fatty acid elongase activity; 3-oxo-lignoceronyl-CoA synthase activity; very-long-chain 3-ketoacyl-CoA synthase activity
Cellular component	dendritic tree; dendrite; integral component of membrane; cell projection; endoplasmic reticulum membrane; soma; membrane; endoplasmic reticulum; integral component of endoplasmic reticulum membrane
Biological process	lipid metabolism; fatty acid biosynthetic process; linoleic acid metabolic process; alpha-linolenic acid metabolic process; fatty acid metabolic process; unsaturated fatty acid biosynthetic process; fatty acid elongation, polyunsaturated fatty acid; very long-chain fatty acid biosynthetic process; fatty acid elongation, monounsaturated fatty acid; long-chain fatty-acyl-CoA biosynthetic process; positive regulation of fatty acid biosynthetic process; fatty acid elongation, saturated fatty acid; sphingolipid biosynthetic process
Sources:Amigo / QuickGO
Orthologs
Databases	NCBI: entry; OMA: entry
Species	Human	Mouse
Entrez	60481	68801
Ensembl	ENSG00000012660	ENSMUSG00000032349
UniProt	Q9NYP7	Q8BHI7
RefSeq (mRNA)	NM_021814; NM_001242828; NM_001242830; NM_001242831; NM_001301856	NM_134255
RefSeq (protein)	NP_001229757; NP_001229759; NP_001229760; NP_001288785; NP_068586	NP_599016
Location (UCSC)	Chr 6: 53.27 – 53.35 Mb	Chr 9: 77.82 – 77.89 Mb
PubMed search
- Wikidata
View/Edit Human	View/Edit Mouse

Elongation of very long chain fatty acids protein 5 is a protein that in humans is encoded by the ELOVL5 gene.
