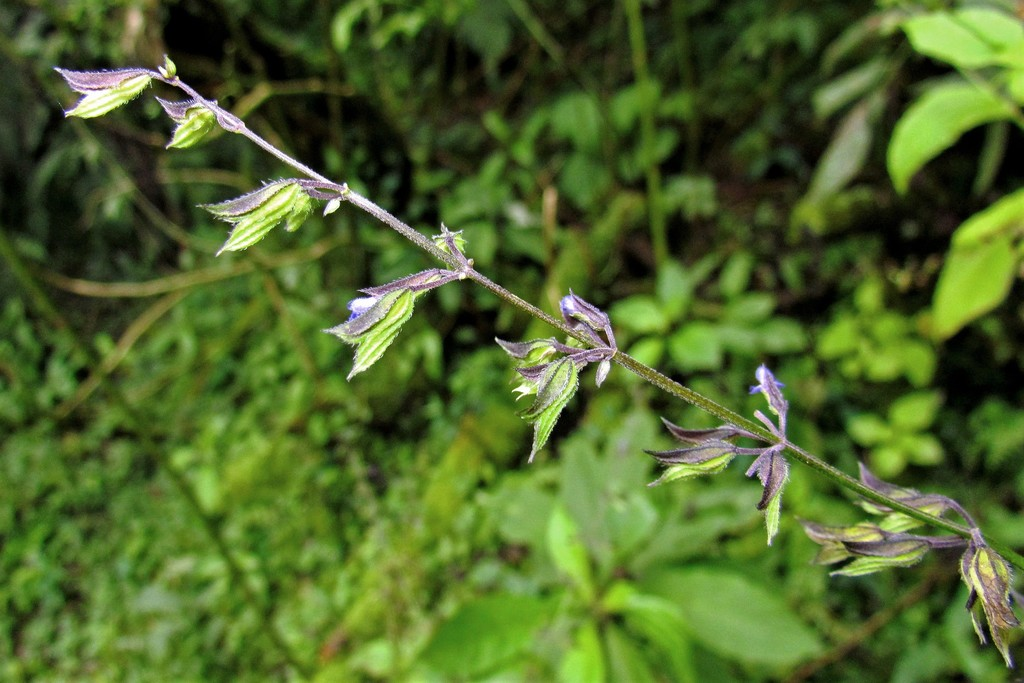

Scientific classification
- Kingdom: Plantae
- Clade: Tracheophytes
- Clade: Angiosperms
- Clade: Eudicots
- Clade: Asterids
- Order: Lamiales
- Family: Lamiaceae
- Genus: Salvia
- Species: S. personata

Binomial name
- Salvia personata Epling

Synonyms
- Salvia alba J.R.I.Wood

= Salvia personata =

Species of herb

Salvia personata is an annual herb that is native to valleys and foothills in the Andes of Bolivia and northern Argentina. It grows in disturbed bushy habitat at 600 to 2,600 m (2,000 to 8,500 ft) elevation.

== Description ==
Salvia personata and Salvia alba were regarded as distinct species by J. R. I. Wood in 2007, and described separately. As of April 2024, Plants of the World Online regarded them as the same species. On this basis, S. personata is an erect plant reaching about 1–1.5 metres (3.3–4.9 ft) high, with many branches, and petiolate leaves that are about 4 to 14 cm (1.6 to 5.5 in) long by 2 to 10 cm (0.79 to 3.94 in) wide. The inflorescence consists of terminal racemes and is up to 25 cm (9.8 in) long. The corolla may be blue or white.
