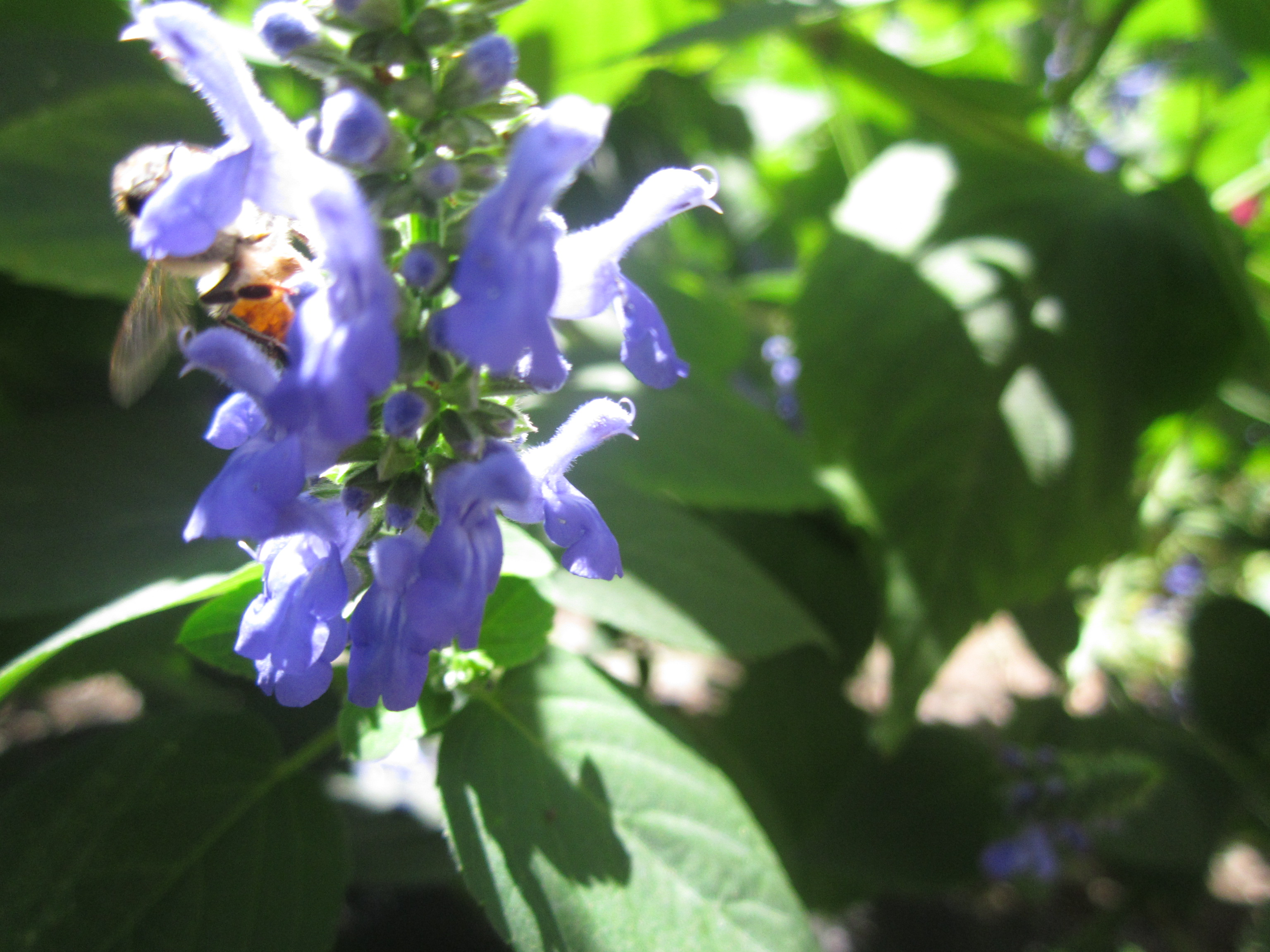

Scientific classification
- Kingdom: Plantae
- Clade: Tracheophytes
- Clade: Angiosperms
- Clade: Eudicots
- Clade: Asterids
- Order: Lamiales
- Family: Lamiaceae
- Genus: Salvia
- Species: S. polystachia

Binomial name
- Salvia polystachia Cav.

Synonyms
- List: Salvia brevicalyx Benth.; Salvia caesia Humb. & Bonpl. ex Willd.; Salvia cataria Briq.; Salvia compacta var. irazuensis Kuntze; Salvia compacta var. latifolia Kuntze; Salvia compacta var. oerstediana Kuntze; Salvia durandiana Briq. ex T.Durand & Pittier; Salvia eremetica Cerv. ex Lag., not validly publ.; Salvia flexuosa C.Prezl ex Benth., nom. illeg.; Salvia ghiesbreghtii Fernald; Salvia igualensis Fernald; Salvia lenta Fernald; Salvia lilacina Fernald; Salvia lineatifolia Lag.; Salvia menthiformis Fernald; Salvia polystachia var. albicans Fernald; Salvia polystachia subsp. caesia (Humb. & Bonpl. ex Willd.) Briq.; Salvia polystachia subsp. durandiana Briq.; Salvia polystachia var. philippensis Fernald; Salvia polystachia var. potosiana Briq.; Salvia polystachia var. seorsa Fernald; Salvia polystachya Ortega, nom. illeg. hom.; Salvia reducta Epling

= Salvia polystachia =

Species of flowering plant

Salvia polystachia, also spelt Salvia polystachya, is a herbaceous perennial native to central Mexico and south through Central America into Panama, typically growing at elevations from 5,000 to 10,000 feet in mild climates where there is some summer rain. It is one of the species used as chia and it is rarely seen in horticulture.

== Description ==
Salvia polystachia grows up to 3–9 ft (1–3 m) in one season, preferring the shelter of other plants because the stems become very brittle. It blooms in late summer or early fall, with 0.5 in (13 mm) flowers that are violet-blue at the edge and fading to white at the center. Many short and slender spikes with verticils of tightly held flowers give the plant its specific epithet polystachia. The leaves are yellow-green, 1 in (2.5 cm) long and wide, and grow in small clusters.

== Taxonomy ==
The species was first described by Antonio José Cavanilles in 1791 using the spelling Salvia polystachia. As of May 2024, this was the spelling used by Plants of the World Online, the International Plant Names Index, and Tropicos. In 1798, Casimiro Gómez Ortega published a description of the species which explicitly referred to Cavanilles' name, but spelt the epithet polystachya. Tropicos regards this as an illegitimate homonym ("nom. illeg. hom.") of Cavanilles' name. Other sources use Ortega's spelling for the epithet; for example, "Salvia polystachya Ort." was used by Calzada et al. in 2010.

To add to the potential confusion, in 1844, Martin Martens and Henri Guillaume Galeotti published the name Salvia polystachya for a different species. As of May 2024, Plants of the World Online regarded this as an illegitimate synonym of Salvia xalapensis.

== Phytochemistry ==
From the aerial parts of Salvia polystachia five neo-clerodane diterpenoids, polystachynes A-E, have been isolated. The structures were established by spectroscopic methods. Other clerodanes such as salvifaricin, linearolactone and dehydrokerlin were also isolated.

Polystachynes A - E
