= Wuhanic acid =

Names
- Preferred IUPAC name (7R,15Z,18R,21Z)-7,18-Dihydroxytetracosa-15,21-dienoic acid
- Other names 7,18-di-OH-24:2-delta-15c,21c

Identifiers
CAS Number	2351868-80-7
3D model (JSmol)	Interactive image
ChEBI	CHEBI:168300
ChemSpider	113369122
PubChem CID	137323799
CompTox Dashboard (EPA)	DTXSID101336489
- InChI: InChI=1S/C24H44O4/c1-2-3-4-12-17-22(25)18-13-9-7-5-6-8-10-14-19-23(26)20-15-11-16-21-24(27)28/h3-4,9,13,22-23,25-26H,2,5-8,10-12,14-21H2,1H3,(H,27,28)/b4-3-,13-9-/t22-,23-/m1/s1 Key: MYDDZMLKINSENR-TZWOSKRLSA-N
- SMILES: CC\C=C/CC[C@@H](O)C\C=C/CCCCCCC[C@@H](O)CCCCCC(O)=O

Properties
Chemical formula	C_{24}H_{44}O_{4}
Molar mass	396.612 g·mol^{−1}
- Except where otherwise noted, data are given for materials in their standard state (at 25 °C [77 °F], 100 kPa). Infobox references

Wuhanic acid ((7R,15Z,18R,21Z)-7,18-dihydroxytetracosa-15,21-dienoic acid) is a 24-carbon dihydroxy fatty acid with the chemical formula C_{24}H_{44}O_{4} and molecular weight 396.6 g/mol.

Wuhanic acid was identified, along with nebraskanic acid, as a major fatty acid of the seed oil of Chinese violet cress (Orychophragmus violaceus L. O.E.Schulz). Wuhanic acid was named in honor of the location of its co-discoverer Chunyu Zhang, a professor in the National Key Lab of Crop Genetic Improvement and College of Plant Science and Technology at Huazhong Agricultural University in Wuhan, Hubei, China.

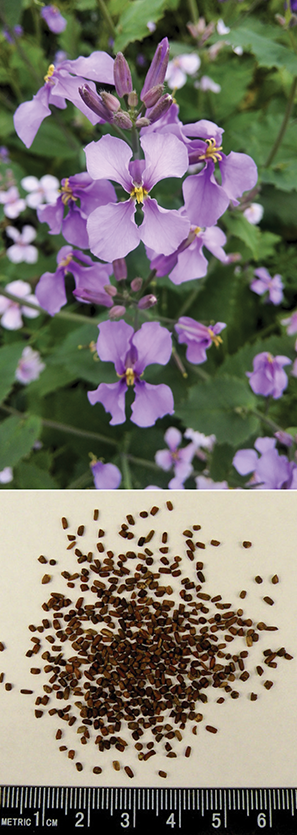
Chinese violet cress flowers and seeds, the source of wuhanic acid rich-oil.

== Biosynthesis ==
Wuhanic acid is believed to arise in part from a "discontinuous elongation" pathway as described for nebraskanic acid biosynthesis. In the proposed biosynthetic pathway, oleic acid bound to phosphatidylcholine is converted to ricinoleic acid by a 12-hydroxylase, a functional variant of the FAD2 Δ12 oleic acid desaturase. Ricinoleic is subsequently released to the acyl-CoA pool where it is elongated to a C20 intermediate. At the second step of fatty acid elongation, the C20 3-OH intermediate is elongated to a C22 5-OH fatty acyl-CoA by a variant FAE1 β-ketoacyl-CoA synthetase. This elongation of the 3-OH intermediate prior to the completion of a full fatty acid elongation cycle was termed discontinuous elongation. This fatty acid undergoes a subsequent complete elongation cycle to form the C24 7,18 dihydroxy fatty acid nebraskanic acid. The omega-3 double bond is believed to be introduced during wuhanic acid biosynthesis by a FAD3 ω-3 fatty acid desaturase.

== Functionality ==
Chinese violet cress oil contains 35% to 50% of the C24 dihydroxy fatty acids wuhanic and nebraskanic acids. This oil was shown to have superior lubricity at 100 °C in metal-on-metal lubrication studies compared to ricinoleic acid-rich castor oil. In these studies, Chinese violet cress oil had ~4-fold lower coefficient of friction relative to castor oil. The unique functionality of Chinese violet cress oil was speculated to result from fatty acids binding to the hydroxyl groups of wuhanic and nebraskanic acids in triacylglycerols to form complex estolides.
