= Elo =

Elo or ELO may refer to:

== Arts and entertainment ==
- Electric Light Orchestra, a British rock music group
  - The Electric Light Orchestra (album), the group's debut album
- Elo, a member magazine for the Tuglas Society

== Biology ==
- Very-long-chain 3-oxoacyl-CoA synthase, an enzyme also known as ELO
- Eleorchis (Elo), an orchid genus

== Organisations and brands ==
- Eurolot (ICAO airline designator), an airline
- Electronic Literature Organization, a nonprofit organisation promoting electronic literary works
- Elo (card association), a Brazilian payment card brand

== Places ==
- Elo, Wisconsin, an unincorporated community in the US
- East Liverpool, Ohio, a city in the US

== Other uses ==
- Elo (name), a surname and given name
- Elo rating system, a system for measuring the relative strength of players in chess and other two-player games
  - World Football Elo Ratings, a ranking system for men's national teams in football
- Saveasi'uleo or Elo, a Samoan god who presides over Pulotu (the underworld)

== See also ==
- ELO 2, the second album by Electric Light Orchestra
- ELO Part II, an offshoot band of Electric Light Orchestra
