= CER6 =

CER6 or Cer6 may refer to:

- Very-long-chain 3-oxoacyl-CoA synthase, an enzyme coded by CER6 gene
- Cer6 (retrotransposon), a LTR retrotransposon described from sequencing data in the chromosome III of C. elegans
- The Transport Canada location identifier for List of airports in the Northwest Territories#Aklavik Water Aerodrome
