= Very-long-chain enoyl-CoA reductase =

Class of enzymes

Identifiers
- EC no.: 1.3.1.93

Databases
- IntEnz: IntEnz view
- BRENDA: BRENDA entry
- ExPASy: NiceZyme view
- KEGG: KEGG entry
- MetaCyc: metabolic pathway
- PRIAM: profile
- PDB structures: RCSB PDB PDBe PDBsum
Search
- PMC: articles
- PubMed: articles
- NCBI: proteins

Very-long-chain enoyl-CoA reductase (EC 1.3.1.93, TSC13 (gene name), CER10 (gene)) is an enzyme with systematic name very-long-chain acyl-CoA:NADP^{+} oxidoreductase. This enzyme catalyses the following chemical reaction

a very-long-chain acyl-CoA + NADP^{+} $\rightleftharpoons$ a very-long-chain trans-2,3-dehydroacyl-CoA + NADPH + H^{+}

This is the fourth component of the elongase, a microsomal protein complex responsible for extending palmitoyl-CoA and stearoyl-CoA.
