= Kamerun =

West African colony of the German Empire from 1884 to 1916

- 1884–1916
- Service flag of the Colonial Office Coat of arms of the German Empire
- Anthem: Heil dir im Siegerkranz "Hail to Thee in the Victor's Crown"
- Location of Kamerun: Green: Territory comprising German colony of Kamerun; Dark grey: Other German colonies Darkest grey: German Empire
- Status: Colony of Germany
- Capital: Jaunde
- Common languages: German (official): Hausa; Fula; Basaa; Beti; Duala; Other local languages
- Government
- Governor
  - 1884 (first): Gustav Nachtigal
  - 1914–1916 (last): Karl Ebermaier
- History
  - Established: 17 August 1884
  - Disestablished: 1916

Area
- 1910: 495,000 km^{2} (191,000 sq mi)
- 1912: 790,000 km^{2} (310,000 sq mi)

Population
  - 1910: 2,600,000
  - 1912: 4,645,000
- Currency: German gold mark
Preceded by
Kingdom of Bamum
Mandara Kingdom
Sokoto Caliphate
Fondom of Bafut
Kotoko kingdom
French Equatorial Africa
Succeeded by
British Cameroon
French Cameroon
French Equatorial Africa
- Today part of: Cameroon; Nigeria; Gabon; Republic of the Congo; Chad; Central African Republic

Kamerun was a Central African colony of the German Empire from 1884 to 1916 in the region of today's Republic of Cameroon. Kamerun also included northern parts of Gabon and the Congo with western parts of the Central African Republic, southwestern parts of Chad and far northeastern parts of Nigeria.

== History ==
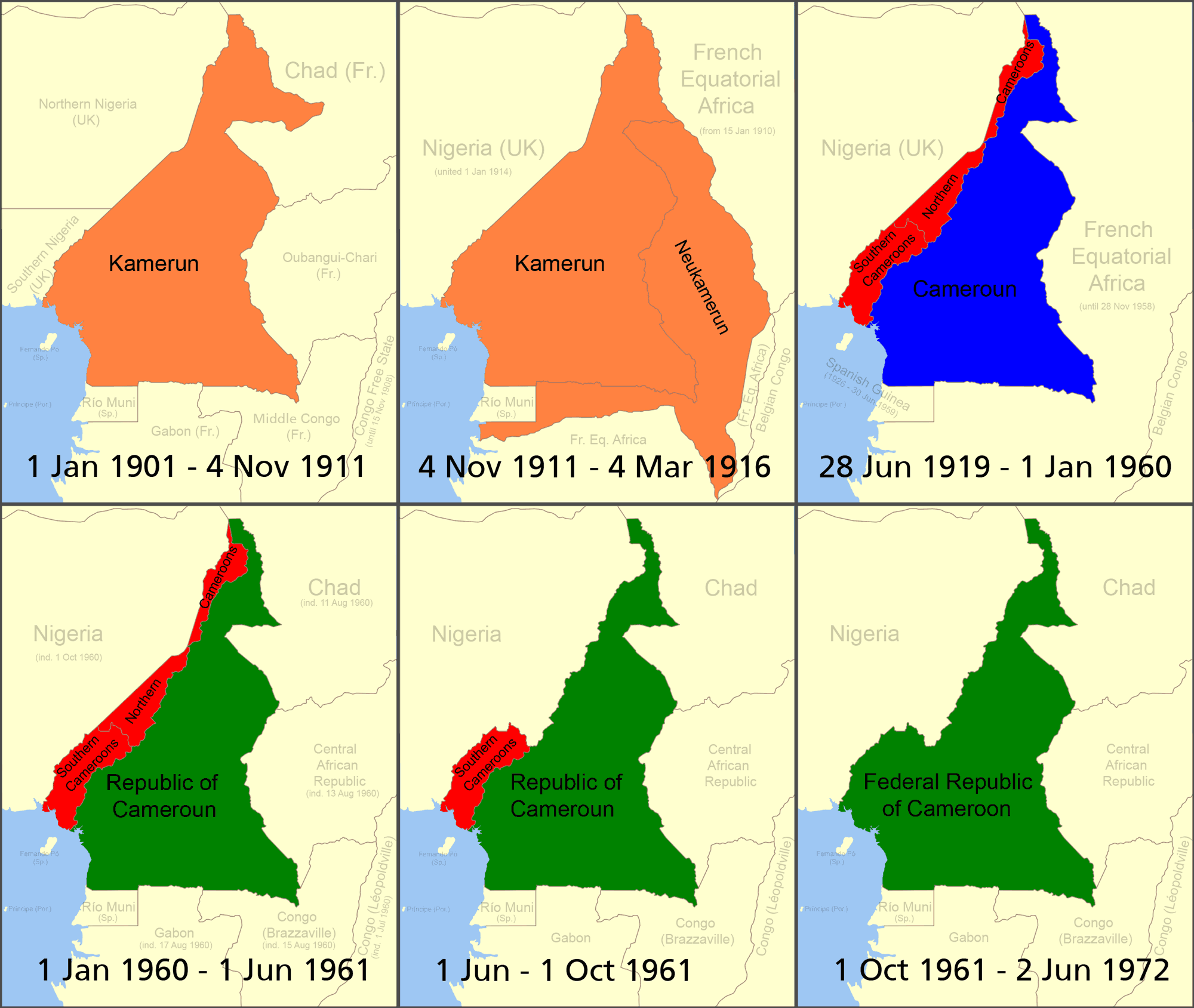
Cameroon, 1901–1972: Kamerun British Cameroons French Cameroon (Cameroun) Independent Cameroon (Cameroun)

=== Years preceding colonization (1868–1883) ===
The first German trading post in the Duala area (Note: Present-day Douala) on the Kamerun River delta (Note: Now the Wouri River delta) was established in 1868 by the Hamburg trading company C. Woermann. The firm's primary agent in Gabon, Johannes Thormählen, expanded activities to the Kamerun River delta. In 1874, together with the Woermann agent in Liberia, Wilhelm Jantzen, the two merchants founded their own company, Jantzen & Thormählen there.

Both of these West Africa houses expanded into shipping with their own sailing ships and steamers and inaugurated scheduled passenger and freight service between Hamburg and Duala. These companies and others obtained extensive acreage from local chiefs and began systematic plantation operations, including bananas. The Cameroon territory was under the informal control of the British Empire throughout the years preceding 1884, with substantial British trading operations as well.

Eventually, these companies would begin agitating for royal protection. By 1884, Adolph Woermann, as spokesman for all West African companies, petitioned the imperial foreign office for "protection" by the German Empire. This, among a number of other factors, led to Imperial Chancellor Otto von Bismarck approving the establishment of a colony.

==== Colonial goals and motivation ====
For many years prior to the 1880s, Bismarck had resisted the idea of colonial ventures in Africa. This was primarily due to Bismarck's focus on securing German interests in Europe itself, especially given the lack of a military infrastructure able to protect colonial interests. Moreover, Germany had no need for the resources that a colony might provide, being largely self sufficient, so a colony would only function as an economic drain. This perspective would change in the early 1880s, due to a variety of internal pressures.

The two key factors motivating this change were pressure from economic interests in Germany, and concerns about missing out on what would later be called the Scramble for Africa. On the political side, colonies became a point of national pride, as Germans saw that other nations had colonies, and thought they should too as a matter of national prestige. Several government officials took this stance, and it seemed to enjoy public support as well. On the commercial side, the companies already operating in Cameroon (represented by the likes of Adolph Woermann) wanted the protection and support an official German colony would provide, and many German producers sought new markets for their excess goods.

These pressures would eventually culminate in Bismarck allowing the establishment of a Cameroonian colony, among others.

=== Initial colonization (1884–1889/90) ===
The official beginning of the German "Protectorate of Cameroon" was on 17 August 1884. Gustav Nachtigal had arrived in Duala in July and negotiated a treaty with a number of rulers local to the region around Duala, at that time the center of Germany's trading operations. From there, he would go on to other parts of Cameroon, securing further treaties with a number of tribes of the regions around the rivers, where trade was already well established. This would establish a trend of using treaties as one method of expanding German control.

As mentioned above, one of the primary motivations for the colony was German corporations seeking to expand their economic interests in Cameroon. Bismarck, being aware of this fact and concerned about the substantial costs of a directly administered colony, opted to instead grant the companies already involved in Cameroon a "Chartered" status. As such, initial government fell to large German trading companies and concession companies who had already established themselves in the colony.

Eventually, however, it was revealed that the companies were not performing their administrative duties very well. A variety of factors contributed to their failure, but foremost among them were ongoing conflicts with local traders as the traders began to move further inland. This deteriorated to the point that it necessitated the German government stepping in and officially taking over.

=== Expansionary era of colonization (1890–1906) ===
From thereon out the administration of the colonies would be at the hands of the German administrators. Regardless, the focus of the colony remained the same: to support the plantation industry and the trade of the German companies. As such, this time saw major expansion in the agricultural industry, and efforts were taken to expand further into the landlocked areas of Cameroon to better trade opportunities and German access to the African interior.

The most notable of the German governors, and the man who would come to define the German legacy in Cameroon, would be Jesko von Puttkammer, who governed from 1895 to 1906 (and for a few shorter times before). It was Puttkammer who began the German behaviors that lend them a reputation of brutality and harshness as colonizers. During his time, he oversaw a number of military campaigns against local peoples like the Bali, forcing those who rebuffed German attempts at a "treaty" that supposedly justified German expansion. Oftentimes, he would not act directly against these people, instead relying on empowering other rival local powers and establishing them as "protected by Germany" and arming them. These groups would then use their newfound power and armaments to conquer dissenting peoples, without the Germans themselves actually ever getting involved.

When the Germans did become involved, however, it was brutal, with them often going out of their way to punish those who surrendered to them if their leader still refused, and taking a tithe of people from conquered peoples as essentially slaves, though they did not call them such. Puttkammer and fellow governor Hans Dominik were responsible for large-scale massacres. At Nachtigal Falls the local adult population was massacred for refusing German protection. The babies of the natives were put in baskets and drowned in the river. Dominik was also known for ordering the mutilation of dead bodies or even living men.

This leads into the second prominent feature of Puttkamer's governorship, his expansion and support for the plantations. This became a problem, as the plantations had more fields than they did workers, so there was a labor shortage. To address this, Puttkamer instituted the "man tithes" mentioned above, in addition to just taking people whenever they conquered new territories or had to put down a rebellion. These people would then be made to do harsh forced labor, with extremely high rates of death. Extreme forms of discipline were practiced too, including the cutting of hands, genitals, gouging of eyes and decapitations. Severed limbs were often collected and shown to local authorities as proof of death. Punishments such as flogging were so excessive the German colonies were referred to as the "Flogging Colonies".

These practices, which continued even after Puttkammer retired from his position, would define the German colonial legacy.

In German Cameroon the indigenous slave trade were banned in 1902 and all slaves born after 1902 declared born free; however the slave trade supplied by slave raids in Northern German Cameroon were, in practice, tolerated the entire German colonial period.

=== Final years (1907–1916) ===
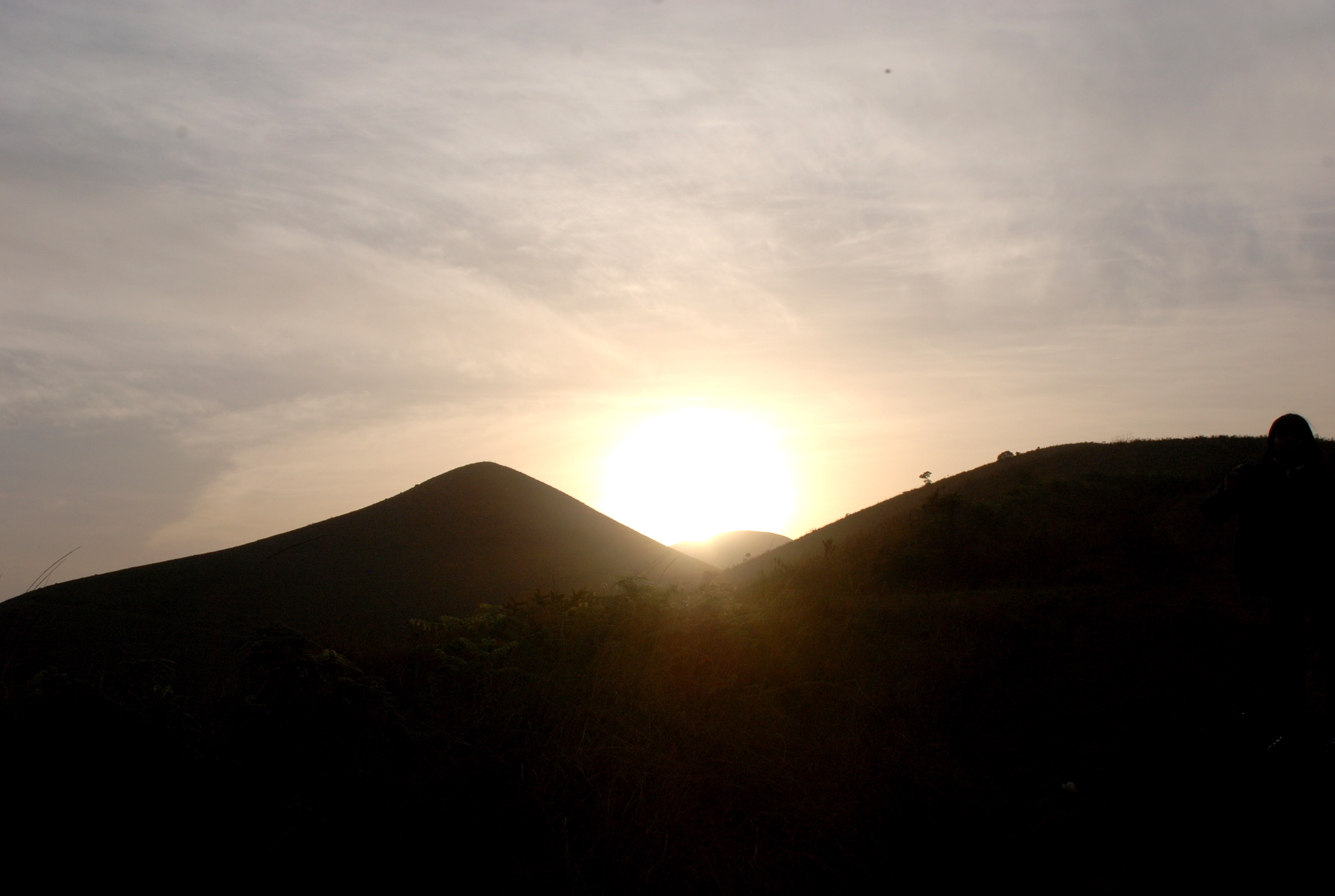
Mount Manengouba

After Puttkamer left his position, aggressive expansion was less common (though more territory would be added via diplomatic means), and the colony began to focus more on development. With subsidies from the imperial treasury, the colony built two rail lines from the port city of Duala to bring agricultural products to market. The Northern line extended 160-kilometre (99 mi) to the Manenguba mountains, and the 300-kilometre (190 mi) mainline went to Makak on the river Nyong. An extensive postal and telegraph system and a river navigation network with government ships connected the coast to the interior.

The Cameroon protectorate was enlarged with New Cameroon (German: Neukamerun) in 1911 as part of the settlement of the Agadir Crisis, resolved by the Treaty of Fez.

=== Loss of Cameroon as a colony ===
At the outbreak of World War I, French, Belgian and British troops invaded the German colony in 1914 and fully occupied it during the Kamerun campaign. Following Germany's defeat, the Treaty of Versailles divided the territory into two League of Nations mandates (Class B) under the administration of the United Kingdom and France. French Cameroon and part of British Cameroon reunified in 1961 to form present-day Cameroon.

Notably, this did not end German involvement in Cameroon, as many former German plantation owners bought their plantations back in the 1920s and 30s. It would take until World War II before Germany was "fully out" of Cameroon.

==== Gallery ====
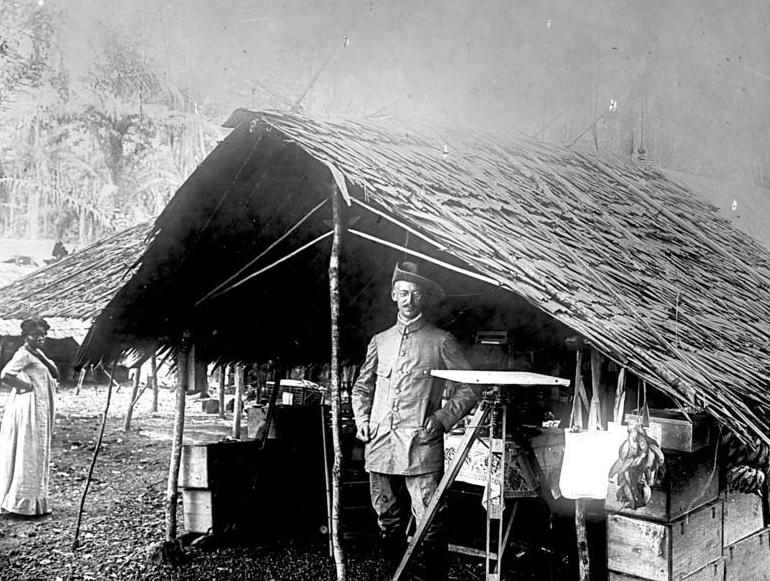
German surveyor in Kamerun, 1884

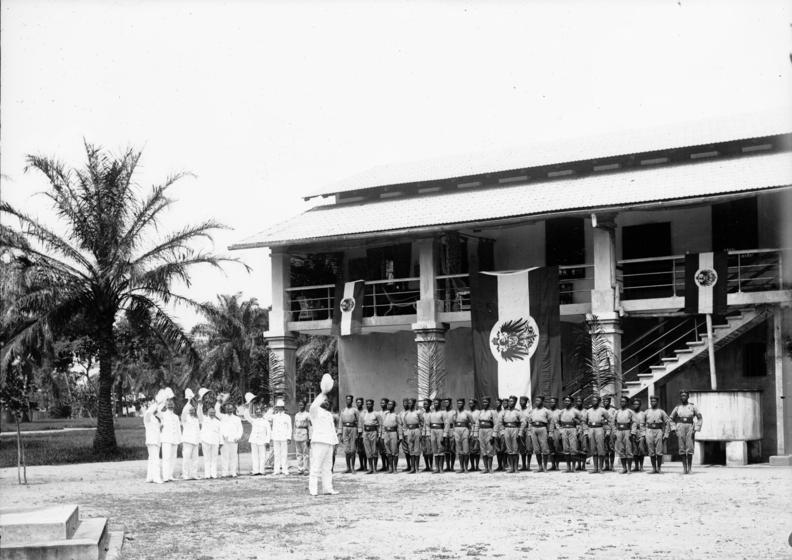
Policemen at Duala on the Kaiser's birthday, 1901

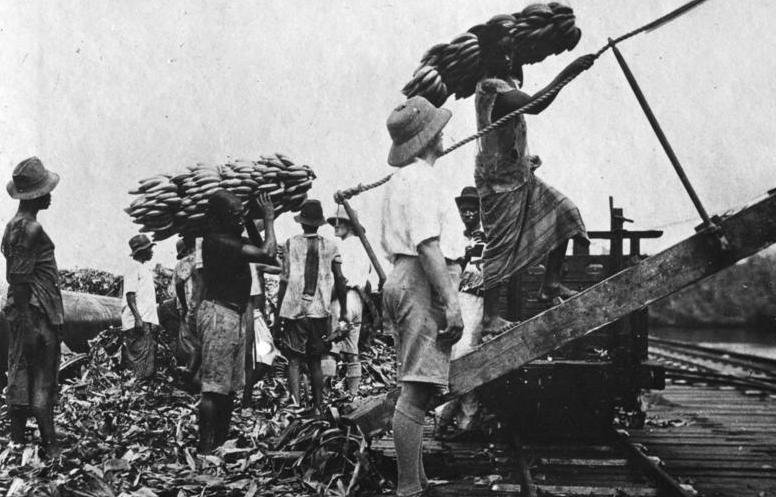
Bananas being loaded for export to Germany, 1912

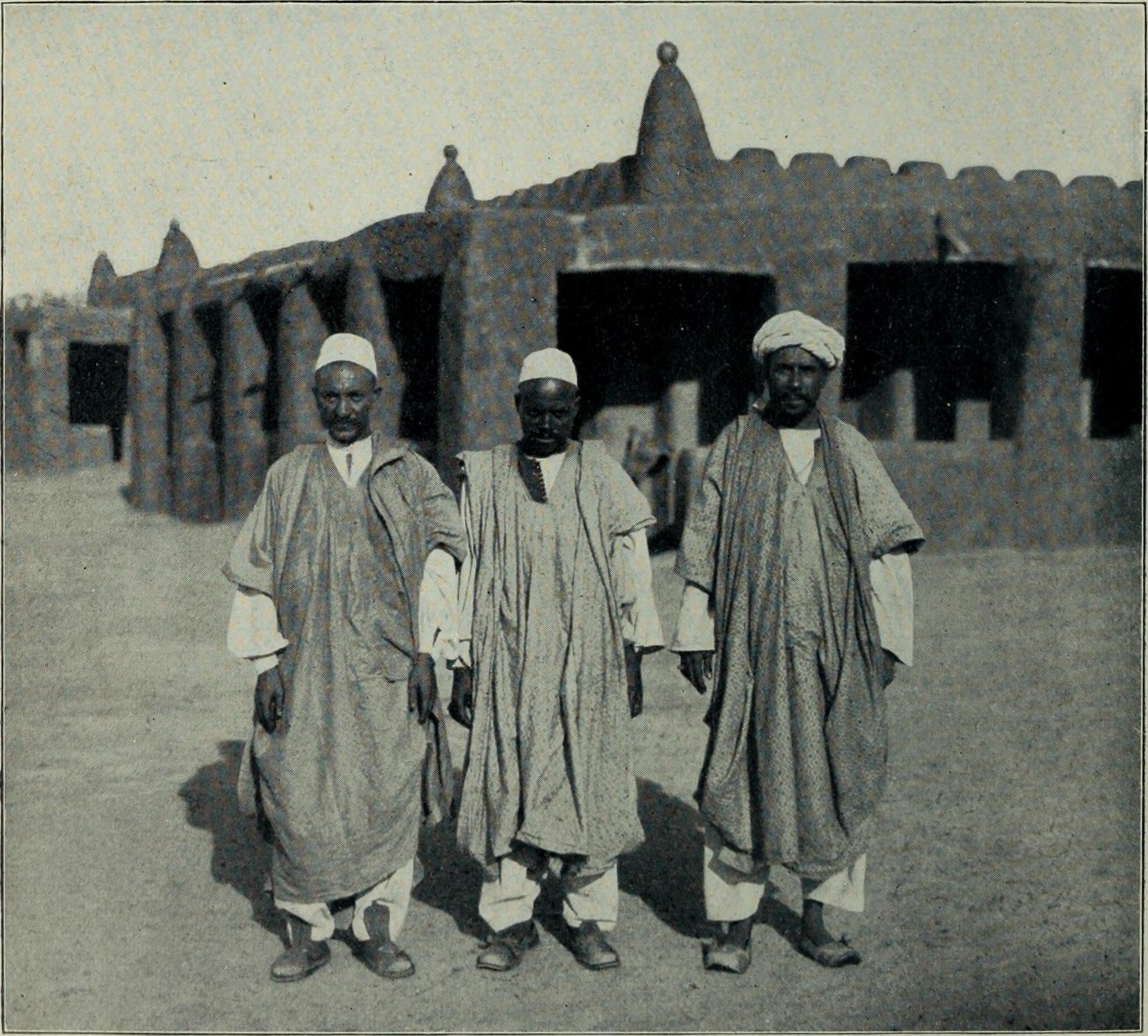
Civilians in Dikoa, located in the far northern region of Kamerun, 1913

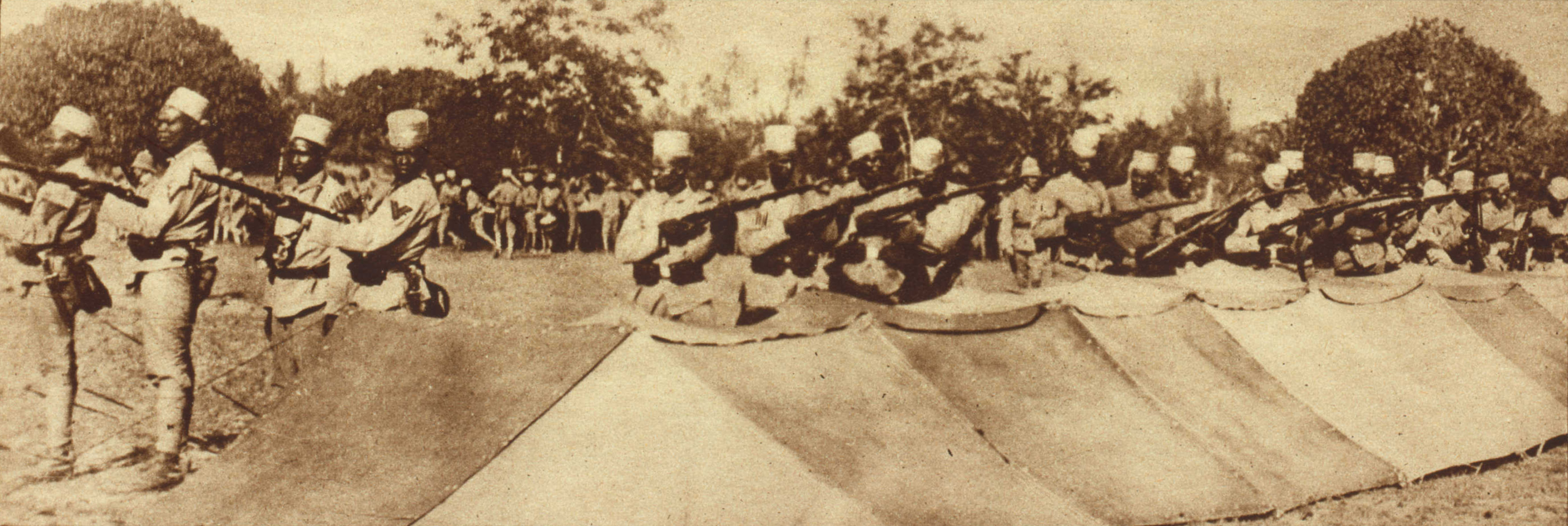
German Kamerun colonial troops, 1914

== Planned symbols for Kamerun ==
In 1914 a series of drafts were made for proposed coat of arms and flags for the German Colonies. However, World War I broke out before the designs were finished and implemented and the symbols were never actually used.

Proposed flag

Proposed coat of arms

== See also ==
- Elo Sambo
- German East Africa
- German South West Africa
- German West African Company
- History of Cameroon
- Index: German colonisation in Africa
- Iwindo
- Kamerun campaign
- New Cameroon
- Ossidinge
- Togoland

== Sources ==
- Fischer, Michael; Senkel, Christian; Tanner, Klaus (2010). Reichsgründung 1871: Ereignis, Beschreibung, Inszenierung. Münster: Bachmann Verlag. ISBN 978-3830971030.
- Tsogang Fossi, Richard. Comment « Cameroons » est devenu allemand. Histoire d'une appropriation par la manipulation et par la force. In: Collective (ed.), Atlas de l'absence. Le patrimoine culturel du Cameroun en Allemagne, Berlin 2023, (English working translation online) Berlin 2023, p. 31–44.
