= Elo (name) =

Elo is a surname and a unisex given name. Notable people with the name are as follows:

== Given name ==
- Elo Edeferioka (born 1993), Nigerian basketball player
- Elo Hansen (born 1945), Danish badminton player
- Elo Romančík (1922–2012), Slovak actor
- Elo Sambo (1885–1933), Cameroonian-German soldier
- Elo Tostenæs (born 1935), Danish rower
- Elo Viiding (born 1974), Estonian poet and writer

== Surname ==
- Arpad Elo (1903–1992), Hungarian-American creator of the Elo rating system
- Colmán Elo (555–611), Irish saint
- Dor Elo (born 1993), Israeli football player
- Eero Elo (born 1990), Finnish ice hockey player
- Jaakko Elo (1925–2017), Finnish physician
- Jere Elo (born 1992), Finnish ice hockey player
- Jorma Elo (born 1961), Finnish choreographer
- Michael Elo (born 1949), Danish musician
- Olavi Elo (1913–1979), Finnish sports shooter
- Pentti Elo (1929–1991), Finnish hockey player
- Simon Elo (born 1986), Finnish politician
- Tiina Elo (born 1971), Finnish politician
- Unto Elo (born 1944), Finnish sprint canoer
