= Scd1 =

Scd1 can refer to:

- Stearoyl-CoA desaturase-1, an enzyme involved in fatty acid metabolism
- /dev/scd1, SCSI audio-oriented optical disk drives
