= Very-long-chain 3-oxoacyl-CoA reductase =

Class of enzymes

Identifiers
- EC no.: 1.1.1.330

Databases
- BRENDA: enzyme data
- ExPASy: NiceZyme view
- KEGG: enzyme entry
- MetaCyc: metabolic pathway
- Rhea: reactions
- PDB structures: RCSB PDB PDBe PDBsum
Search
- PMC: articles
- PubMed: articles
- NCBI: proteins

Very-long-chain 3-oxoacyl-CoA reductase (EC 1.1.1.330, very-long-chain 3-ketoacyl-CoA reductase, very-long-chain beta-ketoacyl-CoA reductase, KCR (gene), IFA38 (gene)) is an enzyme with systematic name (3R)-3-hydroxyacyl-CoA:NADP^{+} oxidoreductase. This enzyme catalyses the following chemical reaction

a very-long-chain (3R)-3-hydroxyacyl-CoA + NADP^{+} $\rightleftharpoons$ a very-long-chain 3-oxoacyl-CoA + NADPH + H^{+}

This microsomal complex extends palmitoyl-CoA and stearoyl-CoA (and their modified forms) to very-long-chain acyl CoAs.
