= C24H46O4 =

The molecular formula C_{24}H_{46}O_{4} (molar mass: 398.62 g/mol, exact mass: 398.3396 u) may refer to:

- Nebraskanic acid
- Dilauroyl peroxide
