= Nebraskanic acid =

Names
- Preferred IUPAC name (7R,15Z,18R)-7,18-Dihydroxytetracos-15-enoic acid
- Other names (7R,15Z,18R)-7,18-Dihydroxytetracosa-15-monoenoic acid 7,18-di-OH-24:1-delta-15c

Identifiers
| 3D model (JSmol) | Interactive image |
| ChEBI | CHEBI:169274 |
| ChemSpider | 113369121 |
| PubChem CID | 134695209 |
| CompTox Dashboard (EPA) | DTXSID401336488 |
- InChI: InChI=1S/C24H46O4/c1-2-3-4-12-17-22(25)18-13-9-7-5-6-8-10-14-19-23(26)20-15-11-16-21-24(27)28/h9,13,22-23,25-26H,2-8,10-12,14-21H2,1H3,(H,27,28)/b13-9-/t22-,23-/m1/s1 Key: XTSZRMFZUAMBRN-FIIQTUGESA-N
- SMILES: CCCCCC[C@H](C/C=C\CCCCCCC[C@H](CCCCCC(=O)O)O)O

Properties
| Chemical formula | C_{24}H_{46}O_{4} |
| Molar mass | 398.628 g·mol^{−1} |
- Except where otherwise noted, data are given for materials in their standard state (at 25 °C [77 °F], 100 kPa). Infobox references

Nebraskanic acid ((7R,15Z,18R)-7,18-dihydroxytetracosa-15-monoenoic acid) is a 24-carbon dihydroxy fatty acid with the chemical formula C_{24}H_{46}O_{4} and molecular weight 398.6 g/mol.

Nebraskanic acid was identified as a major component of the seed oil of Chinese violet cress (Orychophragmus violaceus (L.) O.E.Schulz). This fatty acid also occurs in Chinese violet cress oil with a second 24-carbon dihydroxy fatty acid wuhanic acid [(7R,15Z,18R,21Z)-7,18-dihydroxytetracosa-15,21-dienoic acid]. Nebraskanic and wuhanic acids were named in recognition of the location of their co-discoverers at the University of Nebraska–Lincoln and Huazhong Agricultural University, Wuhan, Hubei, China.

== Biosynthesis ==
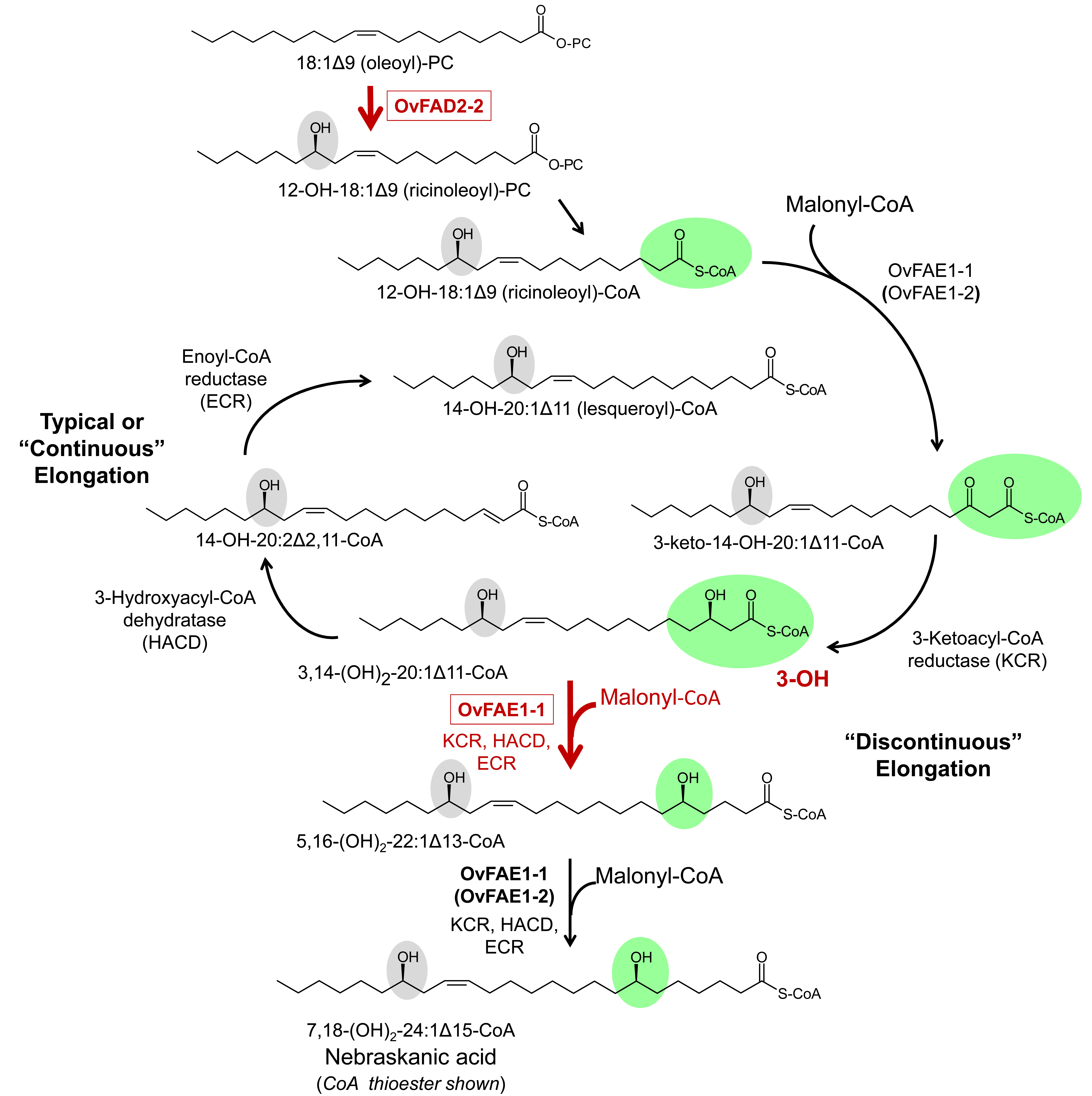
Discontinuous fatty acid elongation pathway for nebraskanic acid biosynthesis.

The proposed biosynthetic pathway of nebraskanic acid is based on biochemical and genetic data obtained from Chinese violet cress seeds. These data are consistent with a biosynthetic pathway that originates from the 12-hydroxylation of oleoyl-CoA by a variant fatty acid desaturase 2 (FAD2) enzyme, followed by partial elongation to a C_{20} 3-OH-CoA intermediate. This intermediate is pulled from the elongation cycle through a process termed "discontinuous elongation" by a variant 3-keotacyl-CoA synthetase or FAE1 and elongated through a continuous or complete cycle. The resulting C_{22} 5-OH fatty acyl-CoA then goes through a continuous elongation cycle that results in the hydroxyl group at the C-7 carbon of the 24-carbon fatty acid chain. This pathway for the biosynthesis of the C-7 hydroxyl group of nebraskanic acid is conceptually similar to the anaerobic pathway for fatty acid desaturation in bacteria. This pathway is genetically supported by the reconstruction of nebraskanic acid synthesis in arabidopsis seeds by co-expression of a 12-fatty acid hydroxylase gene and a variant FAE1 gene from Orychophragmus violaceus.

== Functionality ==
Tribology tests of nebraskanic acid- and wuhanic acid-rich Chinese violet cress oil conducted in the BioDiscovery Institute at the University of North Texas showed that this oil has superior high temperature lubricant properties compared to castor oil for metal-on-metal wear at 100 °C. It was speculated that the hydroxyl groups of nebraskanic acid and wuhanic acid allow formation of additional fatty acid esters or estolides on the triacylglycerol molecules in Chinese violet cress oil.
