= Ossidinge =

Government station and capital of the prefecture in the German colony of Cameroon

Coordinates: 5°53′15″N 9°7′39″E

Ossidinge was a government station and capital of the prefecture in the German colony of Cameroon.

== Location ==
The original Ossidinge station was located about 200 meters from the Cross River located on a low ridge of land between the terraced bank of the Ekoi villages Agborkum and Oban.

== History ==
As part of the licensing of the Gesellschaft Nordwest-Kamerun (GNK) and the transfer of large areas in western Cameroon to it by the colonial administration, the station manager of the government station Rio del Rey, Lieutenant von Queis, was ordered to establish a station as outpost in the area of the Cross River. Queis died in a combat with the Ekoi. The government led a punitive expedition under the command of Captain von Besser, who in July 1900 started to build a station in Nssakpe, which on 17 July 1901 was displaced to Ossidinge by Hans Glauning. On 15 November 1902 it was put under civil administration, managed by Kurt Graf Pückler-Limpurg.

In January 1904, after excesses of European and colored merchants, serious riots of the Anyang started which were living in the North of the station; Pückler-Limpurg was killed and the station was completely destroyed. This uprising was put down by massive military force, and the station was rebuilt. In 1908, however, it still consisted only of makeshift shacks and huts.

Already in 1904, it was considered to relocate the station for health and strategic reasons. In 1909 it was relocated 30 km upstream at Mamfé, which was then called Ossidinge II. On 1 April 1909, the former governmental station was promoted as Bezirksamt (seat of the government of a district). Its last governor was the former Schutztruppe officer Adolf Schipper, who died in 1915 when fighting near Banypo.

Today Ossidinge II is known as Mamfe.

== Sources ==
- Florian Hoffmann: Okkupation und Militärverwaltung in Kamerun. Etablierung und Institutionalisierung des kolonialen Gewaltmonopols 1891–1914, Göttingen 2007
