= Stearoyl-CoA 9-desaturase =

Class of enzymes

SCD

Identifiers
- Aliases: SCD, FADS5, MSTP008, SCD1, SCDOS, hSCD1, stearoyl-CoA desaturase (delta-9-desaturase), stearoyl-CoA desaturase
- External IDs: OMIM: 604031; MGI: 98239; GeneCards: SCD
Available structures
| PDB | Ortholog search: PDBe RCSB |
| PDB | List of PDB id codes 4ZYO |
Enzyme activity
| EC # | BRENDA | ExPASy | KEGG | MetaCyc |
|---|---|---|---|---|
| 1.14.19.1 | ↗ | ↗ | ↗ | ↗ |

Gene location (Human)
| Chr. | Chromosome 10 (human) |
| Band | 10q24.31 | Start | 100,347,233 bp |
| Band | 10q24.31 | End | 100,364,826 bp |

Gene location (Mouse)
| Chr. | Chromosome 19 (mouse) |
| Band | 19 C3|19 37.98 cM | Start | 44,382,894 bp |
| Band | 19 C3|19 37.98 cM | End | 44,396,318 bp |
RNA expression pattern
| Bgee | Human / Mouse (ortholog); Top expressed in: inferior ganglion of vagus nerve; subthalamic nucleus; superior vestibular nucleus; pars reticulata; pars compacta; external globus pallidus; pons; C1 segment; ventral tegmental area; inferior olivary nucleus / Top expressed in: lactiferous gland; tunica adventitia of aorta; skin of external ear; white adipose tissue; subcutaneous adipose tissue; left lobe of liver; gallbladder; tunica media of zone of aorta; mesenteric lymph nodes; parotid gland; More reference expression data |
| BioGPS | n/a |
Gene ontology
| Molecular function | iron ion binding; stearoyl-CoA 9-desaturase activity; oxidoreductase activity; oxidoreductase activity, acting on paired donors, with oxidation of a pair of donors resulting in the reduction of molecular oxygen to two molecules of water; metal ion binding; protein binding; palmitoyl-CoA 9-desaturase activity |
| Cellular component | integral component of membrane; endoplasmic reticulum membrane; endoplasmic reticulum; membrane; nucleolus; integral component of endoplasmic reticulum membrane |
| Biological process | unsaturated fatty acid biosynthetic process; fatty acid biosynthetic process; fatty acid metabolic process; lipid metabolism; regulation of cholesterol biosynthetic process; fatty-acyl-CoA biosynthetic process; monounsaturated fatty acid biosynthetic process; response to fatty acid; positive regulation of cold-induced thermogenesis |
Sources:Amigo / QuickGO
Orthologs
| Databases | NCBI: entry; OMA: entry |
| Species | Human | Mouse |
| Entrez | 6319 | 20249 |
| Ensembl | ENSG00000099194 | ENSMUSG00000037071 |
| UniProt | O00767 | P13516 |
| RefSeq (mRNA) | NM_005063 | NM_009127 |
| RefSeq (protein) | NP_005054 | NP_033153 |
| Location (UCSC) | Chr 10: 100.35 – 100.36 Mb | Chr 19: 44.38 – 44.4 Mb |
| PubMed search |
- Wikidata
| View/Edit Human | View/Edit Mouse |

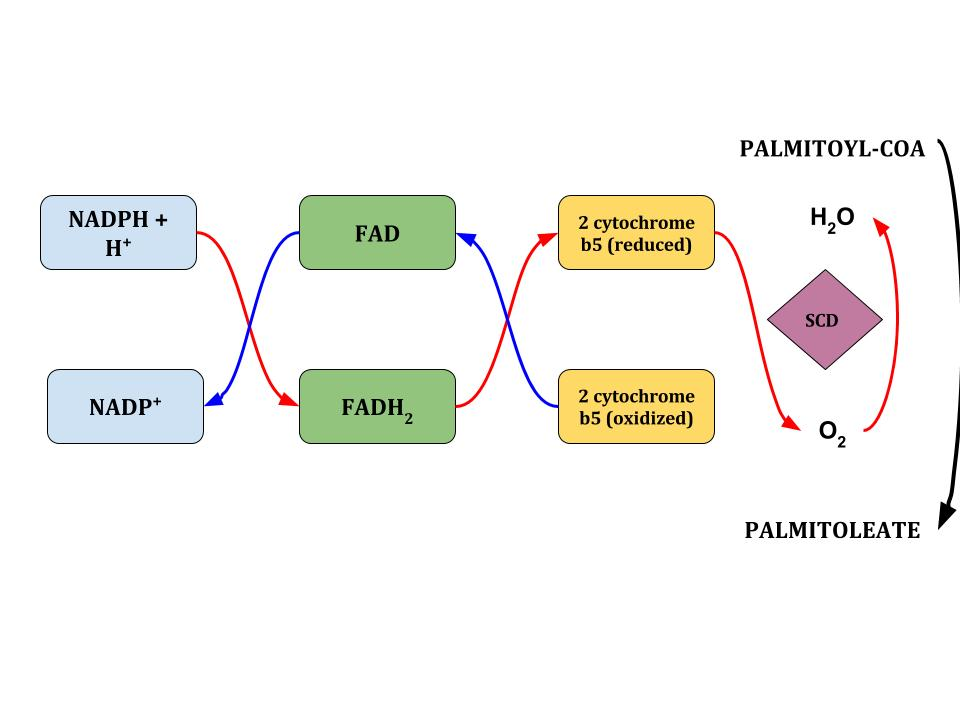
The SCD reaction requires molecular oxygen, NAD(P)-cytochrome b5 reductase, cytochrome b5 to conduct an electron flow from NADPH to the terminal electron acceptor molecular oxygen, releasing water.

Stearoyl-CoA desaturase, also known as Δ-9-desaturase or SCD-1, is a protein that in humans is encoded by the SCD gene. Stearoyl-CoA desaturase is an endoplasmic reticulum enzyme that catalyzes the rate-limiting step in the formation of monounsaturated fatty acids (MUFAs), specifically oleate and palmitoleate from stearoyl-CoA and palmitoyl-CoA. Oleate and palmitoleate are major components of membrane phospholipids, cholesterol esters, and alkyl-diacylglycerol. In humans, the enzyme is present in two isoforms, encoded respectively by the SCD1 and SCD5 genes.

Stearoyl-CoA desaturase is a key enzyme in fatty acid metabolism. It is responsible for forming a double bond in stearoyl-CoA. This is how the monounsaturated fatty acid oleic acid is produced from the saturated fatty acid, stearic acid. A series of redox reactions, during which two electrons flow from NADH to flavoprotein cytochrome b_{5}, then to the electron acceptor cytochrome b_{5} as well as molecular oxygen introduces a single double bond within a row of methylene fatty acyl-CoA substrates. The complexed enzyme adds a single double bond between the C9 and C10 of long-chain acyl-CoAs from de-novo synthesis.

This enzyme belongs to the family of oxidoreductases, specifically those acting on paired donors, with O_{2} as oxidant and incorporation or reduction of oxygen. The oxygen incorporated need not be derived from O_{2} with oxidation of a pair of donors resulting in the reduction of O to two molecules of water. The systematic name of this enzyme class is stearoyl-CoA,ferrocytochrome-b5:oxygen oxidoreductase (9,10-dehydrogenating). This enzyme participates in polyunsaturated fatty acid biosynthesis and PPAR signaling pathway. It employs one cofactor, iron. It is found in animals and fungi.

== Function ==
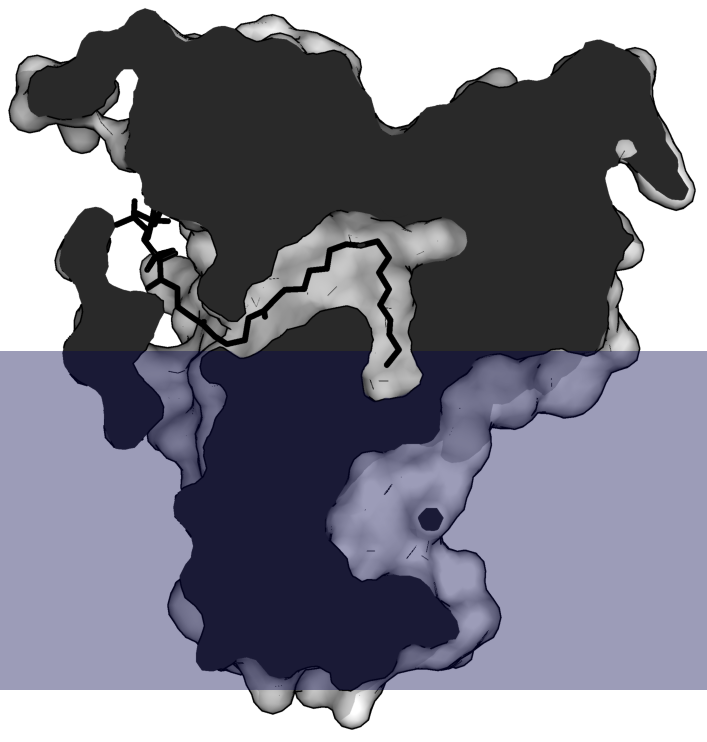
Stearoyl–CoA (black) held in a kinked conformation by SCD1's binding pocket which determines which bond is desaturated. (PDB: 4ZYO)

Stearoyl-CoA desaturase (SCD; EC 1.14.19.1) is an iron-containing enzyme that catalyzes a rate-limiting step in the synthesis of unsaturated fatty acids. The principal product of SCD is oleic acid, which is formed by desaturation of stearic acid.

It catalyzes the chemical reaction

stearoyl-CoA + 2 ferrocytochrome b_{5} + O_{2} + 2 H^{+} $\rightleftharpoons$ oleoyl-CoA + 2 ferricytochrome b_{5} + 2 H_{2}O

The 4 substrates of this enzyme are stearoyl-CoA, ferrocytochrome b5, O_{2}, and H^{+}, whereas its 3 products are oleoyl-CoA, ferricytochrome b5, and H_{2}O.

Promiscuous reactions include:

- Efficient conversion of vaccenyl-CoA into rumenyl-CoA in humans and rats.

=== Biochemical role ===
The ratio of stearic acid to oleic acid has been implicated in the regulation of cell growth and differentiation through effects on cell membrane fluidity and signal transduction.

==== In mammals ====
Four SCD paralogs, Scd1 through Scd4, have been identified in mouse. In contrast, only 2 SCD paralogs, SCD1 and SCD5 (MIM 608370, Uniprot Q86SK9), have been identified in human. SCD1 shares about 85% amino acid identity with all 4 mouse SCD isoforms, as well as with rat Scd1 and Scd2. In contrast, SCD5 (also known as hSCD2) shares limited homology with the rodent SCDs and appears to be unique to primates.

SCD-1 is an important metabolic control point. Inhibition of its expression may enhance the treatment of a host of metabolic diseases. One of the unanswered questions is that SCD remains a highly regulated enzyme, even though oleate is readily available, as it is an abundant monounsaturated fatty acid in dietary fat.

== Structure ==
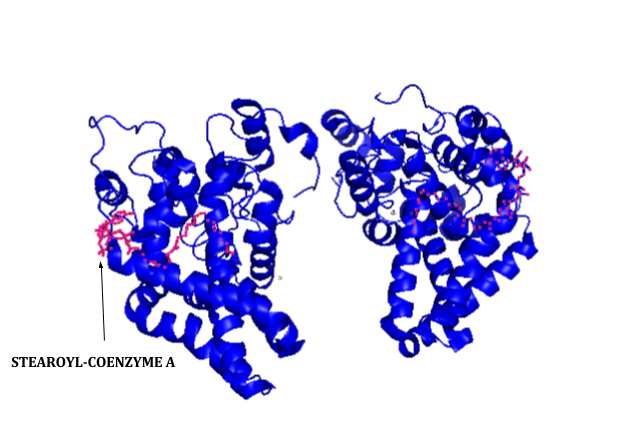
SCD with the major ligand, stearyl-CoA (magenta), docked to the active site. (Monomeric crystal structure, PDB: 4YMK)

The enzyme's structure is key to its function. SCD-1 consists of four transmembrane domains. Both the amino and carboxyl terminus and eight catalytically important histidine regions, which collectively bind iron within the catalytic center of the enzyme, lie in the cytosol region. The five cysteines in SCD-1 are located within the lumen of the endoplasmic reticulum.

The yeast version (OLE1) exists as a dimer in vivo. The two human versions exist as dimers and oligomers in vitro.

The substrate binding site is long, thin and hydrophobic and kinks the substrate tail at the location where the di-iron catalytic centre introduces the double bond.

The literature suggests that the enzyme accomplishes the desaturation reaction by removing the first hydrogen at C9 position and then the second hydrogen from the C-10 position. Because the C-9 and C-10 are positioned close to the iron-containing center of the enzyme, this mechanism is hypothesized to be specific for the position at which the double bond is formed.

== Role in human disease ==
Monounsaturated fatty acids, the products of SCD-1 catalyzed reactions, can serve as substrates for the synthesis of various kinds of lipids, including phospholipids, triglycerides, and can also be used as mediators in signal transduction and differentiation. Because MUFAs are heavily utilized in cellular processes, variation in SCD activity in mammals is expected to influence physiological variables, including cellular differentiation, insulin sensitivity, metabolic syndrome, atherosclerosis, cancer, and obesity. SCD-1 deficiency results in reduced adiposity, increased insulin sensitivity, and resistance to diet-induced obesity.

Under non-fasting conditions, SCD-1 mRNA is highly expressed in white adipose tissue, brown adipose tissue, and the Harderian gland. SCD-1 expression is significantly increased in liver tissue and heart in response to a high-carbohydrate diet, whereas SCD-2 expression is observed in brain tissue and induced during the neonatal myelination. Diets high in high-saturated as well as monounsaturated-fat can also increase SCD-1 expression, although not to the extent of the lipogenic effect of a high-carb diet.

Elevated expression levels of SCD1 is found to be correlated with obesity and tumor malignancy. It is believed that tumor cells obtain most part of their requirement for fatty acids by de novo synthesis. This phenomenon depends on increased expression of fatty acid biosynthetic enzymes that produce required fatty acids in large quantities. Mice that were fed a high-carbohydrate diet had an induced expression of the liver SCD-1 gene and other lipogenic genes through an insulin-mediated SREBP-1c-dependent mechanism. Activation of SREBP-1c results in upregulated synthesis of MUFAs and liver triglycerides. SCD-1 knockout mice did not increase de novo lipogenesis but created an abundance of cholesterol esters.

SCD1 function has also been shown to be involved in germ cell determination, adipose tissue specification, liver cell differentiation and cardiac development.

The human SCD-1 gene structure and regulation is very similar to that of mouse SCD-1. Overexpression of SCD-1 in humans may be involved in the development of hypertriglyceridemia, atherosclerosis, and diabetes. One study showed that SCD-1 activity was associated with inherited hyperlipidemia. SCD-1 deficiency has also been shown to reduce ceramide synthesis by downregulating serine palmitoyltransferase. This consequently increases the rate of beta-oxidation in skeletal muscle.

In carbohydrate metabolism studies, knockout SCD-1 mice show increased insulin sensitivity. Oleate is a major constituent of membrane phospholipids and membrane fluidity is influenced by the ratio of saturated to monounsaturated fatty acids. One proposed mechanism is that an increase in cell membrane fluidity, consisting largely of lipid, activates the insulin receptor. A decrease in MUFA content of the membrane phospholipids in the SCD-1^{−/−} mice is offset by an increase in polyunsaturated fatty acids, effectively increasing membrane fluidity due to the introduction of more double bonds in the fatty acyl chain.

== See also ==
- Cyclopropene acid
- Fatty acid desaturase
- Fatty acid synthesis

== Bibliography ==
- FULCO AJ, BLOCH K (1964). "Cofactor Requirements for the Formation of Delta-9-Unsaturated Fatty Acids in Mycobacterium Phlei". J. Biol. Chem. 239 (4): 993–7. doi:10.1016/S0021-9258(18)91378-5. PMID 14167617.
- Oshino N, Imai Y, Sato R (1966). "Electron-transfer mechanism associated with fatty acid desaturation catalyzed by liver microsomes". Biochim. Biophys. Acta. 128 (1): 13–27. doi:10.1016/0926-6593(66)90137-8. PMID 4382040.
- Oshino N, Imai Y, Sato R (January 1971). "A function of cytochrome b5 in fatty acid desaturation by rat liver microsomes". J. Biochem. 69 (1). Tokyo: 155–67. doi:10.1093/oxfordjournals.jbchem.a129444. PMID 5543646.
- Strittmatter P, Spatz L, Corcoran D, Rogers MJ, Setlow B, Redline R (1974). "Purification and properties of rat liver microsomal stearyl coenzyme A desaturase". Proc. Natl. Acad. Sci. U.S.A. 71 (11): 4565–9. Bibcode:1974PNAS...71.4565S. doi:10.1073/pnas.71.11.4565. PMC 433928. PMID 4373719.
