= Acyl-CoA-binding protein =

ACBP
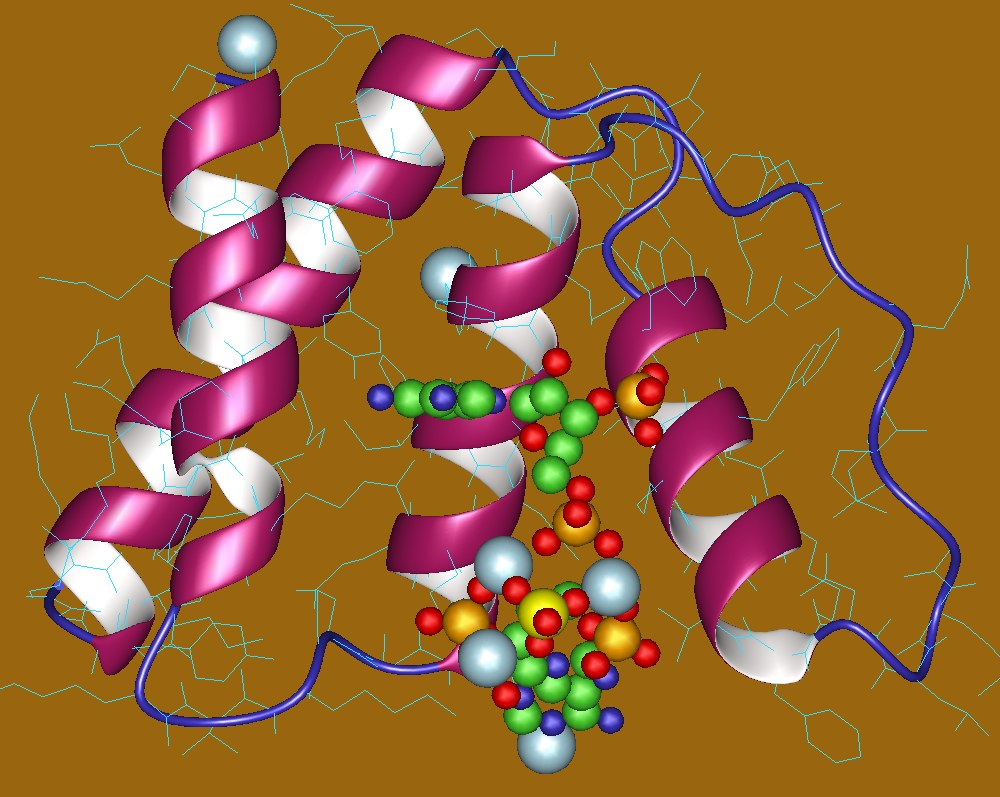
- Acyl-CoA-binding protein monomer, Human

Identifiers
- Symbol: ACBP
- Pfam: PF00887
- InterPro: IPR000582
- PROSITE: PDOC00686
- SCOP2: 1aca / SCOPe / SUPFAM
- OPM superfamily: 295
- OPM protein: 2wh5
- CDD: cd00435
- Membranome: 497
Available protein structures:
- PDB: IPR000582 PF00887 (ECOD; PDBsum)
- AlphaFold: IPR000582; PF00887

In molecular biology, the acyl-CoA-binding protein (ACBP) is a small (10 kDa) protein that binds medium- and long-chain acyl-CoA esters with very high affinity and may function as an intracellular carrier of acyl-CoA esters. ACBP is also known as diazepam binding inhibitor (DBI) or endozepine (EP) because of its ability to displace diazepam from the benzodiazepine (BZD) recognition site located on the GABA type A receptor. It is therefore possible that this protein also acts as a neuropeptide to modulate the action of the GABA receptor.

ACBP is a highly conserved protein of about 90 amino acids that is found in all four eukaryotic kingdoms, Animalia, Plantae, Fungi and Protista, and in some eubacterial species.

Although ACBP occurs as a completely independent protein, intact ACB domains have been identified in a number of large, multifunctional proteins in a variety of eukaryotic species. These include large membrane-associated proteins with N-terminal ACB domains, multifunctional enzymes with both ACB and peroxisomal enoyl-CoA Delta(3), Delta(2)-enoyl-CoA isomerase domains, and proteins with both an ACB domain and ankyrin repeats.

The ACB domain consists of four alpha-helices arranged in a bowl shape with a highly exposed acyl-CoA-binding site. The ligand is bound through specific interactions with residues on the protein, most notably several conserved positive charges that interact with the phosphate group on the adenosine-3'phosphate moiety, and the acyl chain is sandwiched between the hydrophobic surfaces of CoA and the protein.

Other proteins containing an ACB domain include:

- Endozepine-like peptide (ELP) (gene DBIL5) from mouse. ELP is a testis-specific ACBP homologue that may be involved in the energy metabolism of the mature sperm.
- MA-DBI, a transmembrane protein of unknown function which has been found in mammals. MA-DBI contains a N-terminal ACB domain.
- DRS-1, a human protein of unknown function that contains a N-terminal ACB domain and a C-terminal enoyl-CoA isomerase/hydratase domain.
