= Icosanoyl-CoA synthase =

Identifiers
- EC no.: 2.3.1.119
- CAS no.: 141256-55-5

Databases
- IntEnz: IntEnz view
- BRENDA: BRENDA entry
- ExPASy: NiceZyme view
- KEGG: KEGG entry
- MetaCyc: metabolic pathway
- PRIAM: profile
- PDB structures: RCSB PDB PDBe PDBsum
Search
- PMC: articles
- PubMed: articles
- NCBI: proteins

In enzymology, an icosanoyl-CoA synthase (EC 2.3.1.119) is an enzyme that catalyzes the chemical reaction

stearoyl-CoA + malonyl-CoA + 2 NAD(P)H + 2 H^{+} $\rightleftharpoons$ icosanoyl-CoA + CO_{2} + CoA + 2 NAD(P)+ + H_{2}O

The 5 substrates of this enzyme are stearoyl-CoA, malonyl-CoA, NADH, NADPH, and H^{+}, whereas its 6 products are icosanoyl-CoA, CO_{2}, CoA, NAD^{+}, NADP^{+}, and H_{2}O.

This enzyme belongs to the family of transferases, specifically those acyltransferases transferring groups other than aminoacyl groups. The systematic name of this enzyme class is stearoyl-CoA:malonyl-CoA C-acyltransferase (decarboxylating, oxoacyl- and enoyl-reducing). Other names in common use include acyl-CoA elongase, C18-CoA elongase, and stearoyl-CoA elongase.
