= DBI33-50 =

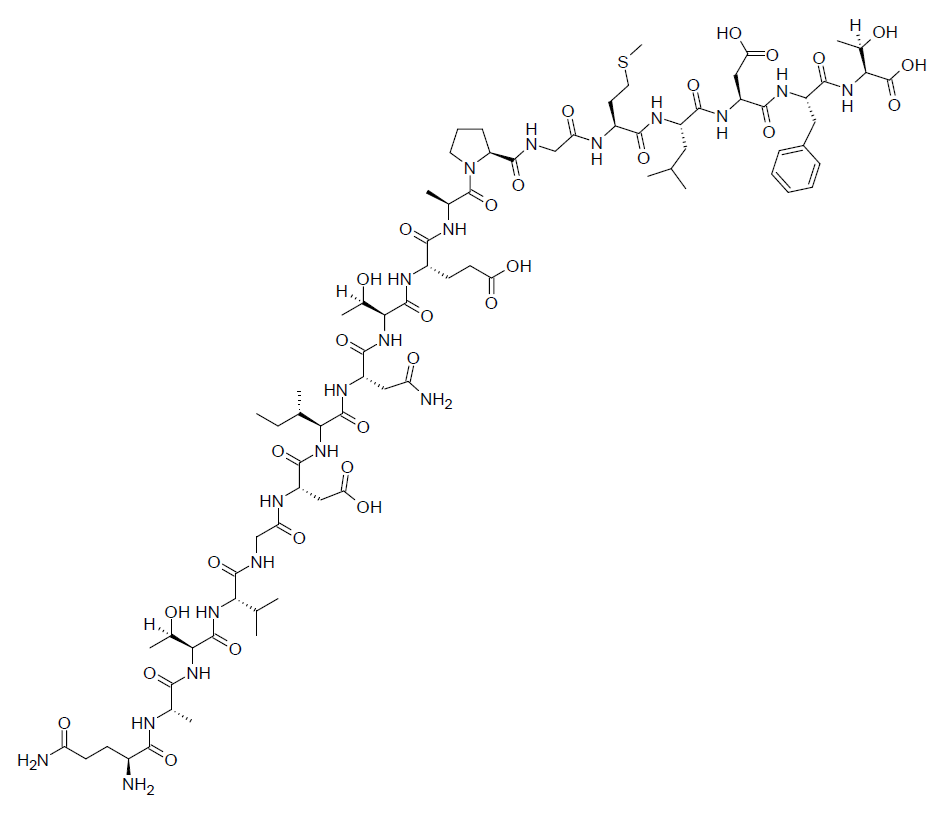

Identifiers
- CAS Number: (rat version) 95237-86-8 (rat version)
- PubChem CID: 16130993
- ChemSpider: 17287706

Chemical and physical data
- Formula: C_{80}H_{126}N_{20}O_{30}S
- Molar mass: 1880.06 g·mol^{−1}
- 3D model (JSmol): Interactive image
- SMILES: C[C@H]([C@@H](C(=O)N[C@@H](C(C)C)C(=O)NCC(=O)N[C@@H](CC(=O)O)C(=O)N[C@@H](C(C)C)C(=O)N[C@@H](CC(=O)N)C(=O)N[C@@H]([C@@H](C)O)C(=O)N[C@@H](CC(=O)O)C(=O)N[C@@H](CCCNC(=N)N)C(=O)N1CCC[C@H]1C(=O)NCC(=O)N[C@@H](CC(C)C)C(=O)N[C@@H](CC(C)C)C(=O)N[C@@H](CC(=O)O)C(=O)N[C@@H](CC(C)C)C(=O)N[C@@H](CCCCN)C(=O)O)NC(=O)[C@H](C)NC(=O)[C@H](CCC(=O)N)N)O
- InChI: InChI=1S/C81H138N24O29/c1-35(2)26-46(67(120)96-48(28-37(5)6)69(122)98-51(31-59(114)115)71(124)97-47(27-36(3)4)68(121)95-45(80(133)134)18-14-15-23-82)92-56(110)33-89-74(127)53-20-17-25-105(53)79(132)44(19-16-24-88-81(86)87)94-70(123)52(32-60(116)117)100-77(130)63(41(12)106)104-72(125)49(29-55(85)109)99-76(129)62(39(9)10)101-73(126)50(30-58(112)113)93-57(111)34-90-75(128)61(38(7)8)102-78(131)64(42(13)107)103-65(118)40(11)91-66(119)43(83)21-22-54(84)108/h35-53,61-64,106-107H,14-34,82-83H2,1-13H3,(H2,84,108)(H2,85,109)(H,89,127)(H,90,128)(H,91,119)(H,92,110)(H,93,111)(H,94,123)(H,95,121)(H,96,120)(H,97,124)(H,98,122)(H,99,129)(H,100,130)(H,101,126)(H,102,131)(H,103,118)(H,104,125)(H,112,113)(H,114,115)(H,116,117)(H,133,134)(H4,86,87,88)/t40-,41+,42+,43-,44-,45-,46-,47-,48-,49-,50-,51-,52-,53-,61-,62-,63-,64-/m0/s1; Key:PTVIBIVJSXWMPT-FGSANIJTSA-N

DBI_{33-50} (Octadecaneuropeptide, ODN) is an endogenous polypeptide with the amino acid sequence QATVGDINTERPGMLDFT. It consists of residues 33–50 of the diazepam binding inhibitor (DBI), generated by proteolytic cleavage of the parent protein. A related fragment, DBI_{17-50} (triakontatetraneuropeptide, TTN), shares similar biological effects but is expressed in different tissues.

DBI itself is highly expressed in the gastrointestinal tract, where it inhibits the secretion of hormones such as insulin and cholecystokinin. ODN (but not TTN) also suppresses insulin release. However, both peptides are more widely studied as neuropeptides in the brain, where they are secreted by astrocytes and act as endogenous allosteric modulators of benzodiazepine receptors (endozepines). ODN primarily acts at the central benzodiazepine receptor, while TTN preferentially targets the so-called peripheral benzodiazepine receptor (TSPO), which is also present in the brain.

In addition to its benzodiazepine site activity, ODN binds to a distinct metabotropic receptor. At benzodiazepine receptors it displays a biphasic action: at low concentrations it acts as a positive allosteric modulator, mainly at α5-containing GABA_{A} receptor subtypes, whereas at higher concentrations it acts as a negative allosteric modulator, particularly at α3-containing GABA_{A} receptors.

Pathologically elevated ODN levels can therefore produce effects opposite to those of benzodiazepines, and have been linked to anxiety and epilepsy. At normal physiological concentrations, by contrast, ODN is neuroprotective, promotes neurogenesis, and regulates immune responses by modulating interleukin production. Disruption of ODN signaling is thought to contribute to adverse effects associated with long-term benzodiazepine use, including cognitive impairment and delayed wound healing.
