= Diazepam binding inhibitor =

Protein found in humans

DBI
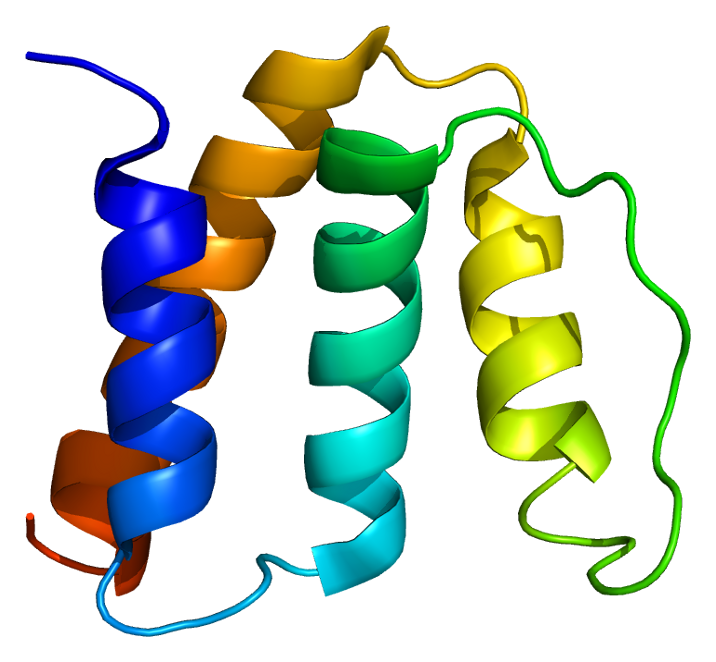

Identifiers
- Aliases: DBI, ACBD1, ACBP, CCK-RP, EP, Diazepam binding inhibitor, diazepam binding inhibitor (GABA receptor modulator, acyl-CoA binding protein), diazepam binding inhibitor, acyl-CoA binding protein
- External IDs: OMIM: 125950; MGI: 94865; GeneCards: DBI
Available structures
PDB	Ortholog search: PDBe RCSB
PDB	List of PDB id codes 2FJ9, 2CB8

Gene location (Human)
Chr.	Chromosome 2 (human)
Band	2q14.2	Start	119,366,924 bp
Band	2q14.2	End	119,372,550 bp

Gene location (Mouse)
Chr.	Chromosome 1 (mouse)
Band	1|1 E2.3	Start	120,041,010 bp
Band	1|1 E2.3	End	120,048,808 bp
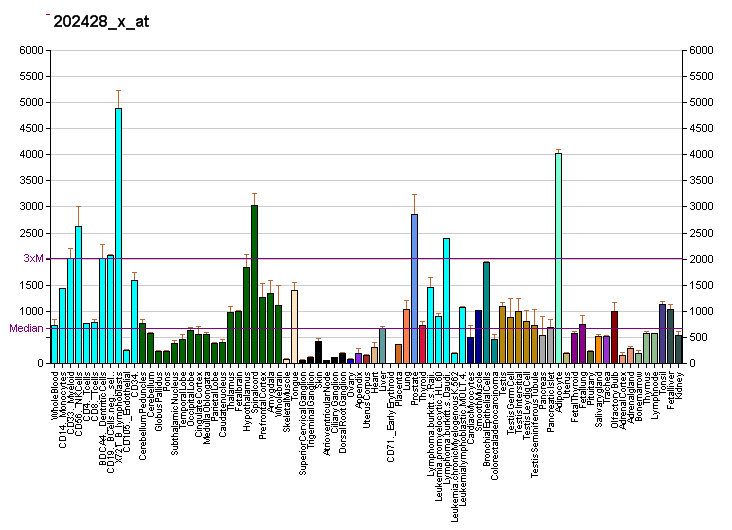

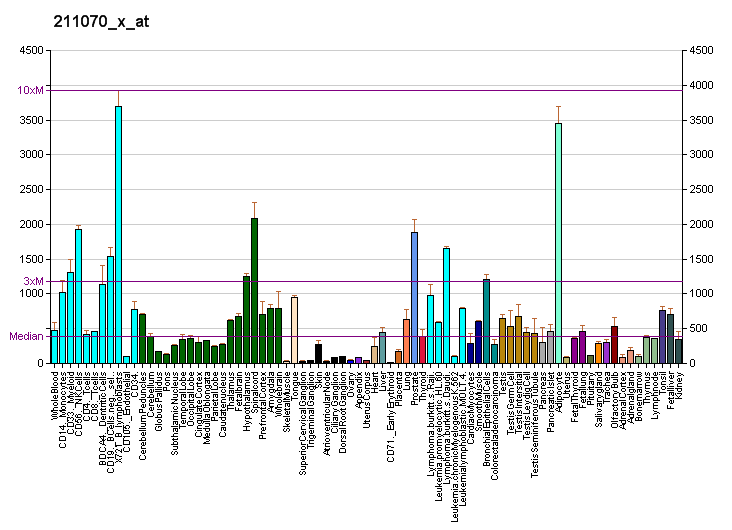

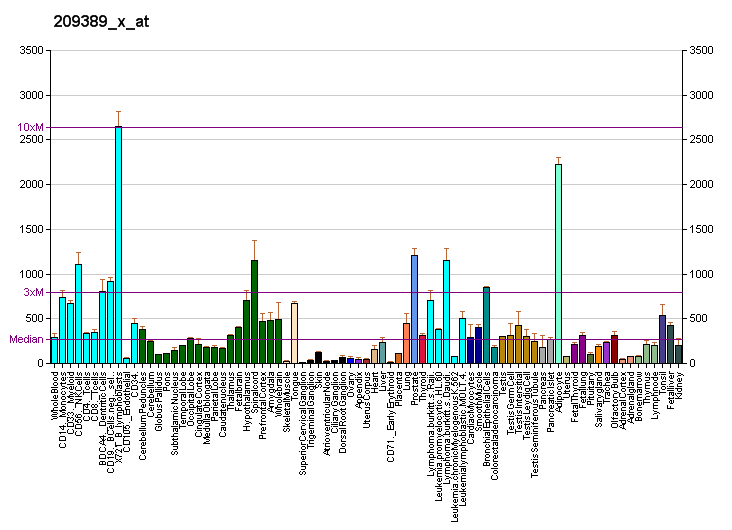
RNA expression pattern
Bgee	Human / Mouse (ortholog); Top expressed in: vulva; mucosa of transverse colon; gingival epithelium; sperm; skin of thigh; oral cavity; mucosa of pharynx; human penis; skin of hip; ventricular zone / Top expressed in: optic nerve; brown adipose tissue; white adipose tissue; right kidney; subcutaneous adipose tissue; tunica adventitia of aorta; lactiferous gland; medial ganglionic eminence; ventricular zone; Epithelium of choroid plexus; More reference expression data
BioGPS	More reference expression data
Gene ontology
Molecular function	benzodiazepine receptor binding; lipid binding; long-chain fatty acyl-CoA binding; fatty-acyl-CoA binding; protein dimerization activity
Cellular component	Golgi apparatus; perinuclear endoplasmic reticulum; extracellular exosome; endoplasmic reticulum; endoplasmic reticulum lumen
Biological process	protein palmitoylation; phosphatidylcholine acyl-chain remodeling; acyl-CoA metabolic process; transport
Sources:Amigo / QuickGO
Orthologs
Databases	NCBI: entry; OMA: entry
Species	Human	Mouse
Entrez	1622	13167
Ensembl	ENSG00000155368	ENSMUSG00000026385
UniProt	P07108	P31786
RefSeq (mRNA)	NM_001079862; NM_001079863; NM_001178017; NM_001178041; NM_001178042 NM_001178043; NM_001282633; NM_001282634; NM_001282635; NM_001282636; NM_020548; NM_001352432	NM_001037999; NM_007830
RefSeq (protein)	NP_001073331; NP_001073332; NP_001171488; NP_001171512; NP_001171513 NP_001171514; NP_001269562; NP_001269563; NP_001269564; NP_001269565; NP_065438; NP_001339361	NP_001033088; NP_031856
Location (UCSC)	Chr 2: 119.37 – 119.37 Mb	Chr 1: 120.04 – 120.05 Mb
PubMed search
- Wikidata
View/Edit Human	View/Edit Mouse

Acyl-CoA-binding protein in humans belongs to the family of Acyl-CoA-binding proteins.

This gene encodes diazepam binding inhibitor, a protein that is regulated by (and regulates the release of) hormones including insulin, and is involved in lipid metabolism and the displacement of beta-carbolines and benzodiazepines, which modulate signal transduction at type A gamma-aminobutyric acid receptors located in brain synapses. The protein is conserved from yeast to mammals, with the most highly conserved domain consisting of seven contiguous residues that constitute the hydrophobic binding site for medium- and long-chain acyl-Coenzyme A esters. Diazepam binding inhibitor also mediates the feedback regulation of pancreatic secretion and the postprandial release of cholecystokinin, in addition to its role as a mediator in corticotropin-dependent synthesis of steroids in the adrenal gland. Three pseudogenes located on chromosomes 6, 8 and 16 have been identified. Multiple transcript variants encoding different isoforms have also been described for this gene.

== See also ==
- Diazepam
- DBI33-50
- Endozepine
