= Very-long-chain (3R)-3-hydroxyacyl-CoA dehydratase =

Identifiers
- EC no.: 4.2.1.134

Databases
- BRENDA: enzyme data
- ExPASy: NiceZyme view
- KEGG: enzyme entry
- MetaCyc: metabolic pathway
- Rhea: reactions
- PDB structures: RCSB PDB PDBe PDBsum
Search
- PMC: articles
- PubMed: articles
- NCBI: proteins

Very-long-chain (3R)-3-hydroxyacyl-CoA dehydratase (EC 4.2.1.134, PHS1 (gene), PAS2 (gene)) is an enzyme with systematic name very-long-chain (3R)-3-hydroxyacyl-CoA hydro-lyase. This enzyme catalyses the following chemical reaction

a very-long-chain (3R)-3-hydroxyacyl-CoA $\rightleftharpoons$ a very-long-chain trans-2,3-dehydroacyl-CoA + H_{2}O

This is the third component of the elongase.
