= Iwindo =

District in the German colony of Kamerun

Iwindo was a district within the German colony of Kamerun, lying along the Ivindo River, presently in Gabon. Most of it was part of Neukamerun, a territory ceded by France to Germany as a result of the 1911 Morocco–Congo Treaty. Its administrative seat was Minkebe .

The 12th Company of the German Imperial Schutztruppe for Cameroon, newly formed in Yaoundé and under the direction of Captain Theodor von Heigelin, took control of Iwindo in the summer of 1912. By government decree of 17 January 1913 the station Akoafim, previously part of the district Ebolowa in "old" Kamerun, was added to the jurisdiction of the 11th Company. Heigelin received the management powers over the district.

The base of the Company was initially located in the military post Ngarabinsam, in former French territory. In April 1914, the administrative headquarters was transferred to Akoafim, and shortly before the outbreak of World War I to Minkebe.
