= Endozepine =

Endozepines are endogenous compounds that bind to the benzodiazepine binding site on the GABA_{A} receptor complex. That is to say, endozepines are the natural ligands of the benzodiazepine receptor. Endozepines may have sedative effects similar to benzodiazepine medications such as diazepam, or they may have opposite effects, depending on whether they are agonists, antagonists, or inverse agonists.

Endozepines have been linked to hepatic encephalopathy and have controversially been linked to some cases of recurrent stupor. Initially, the key diagnostic test is stupor which is sensitive to the benzodiazepine receptor antagonist flumazenil in the absences of exogenous benzodiazepines. Other roles include regulation of appetite and glucose metabolism, and processes relating to inflammation and pain signalling.

Potential candidates for these compounds are:

- Oleamide
- Nonpeptidic endozepines such as inosine
- The protein diazepam binding inhibitor (DBI) and polypeptide fragments derived from it such as the octadecaneuropeptide ODN (DBI33-50) and triakontatetraneuropeptide TTN (DBI17-50)
