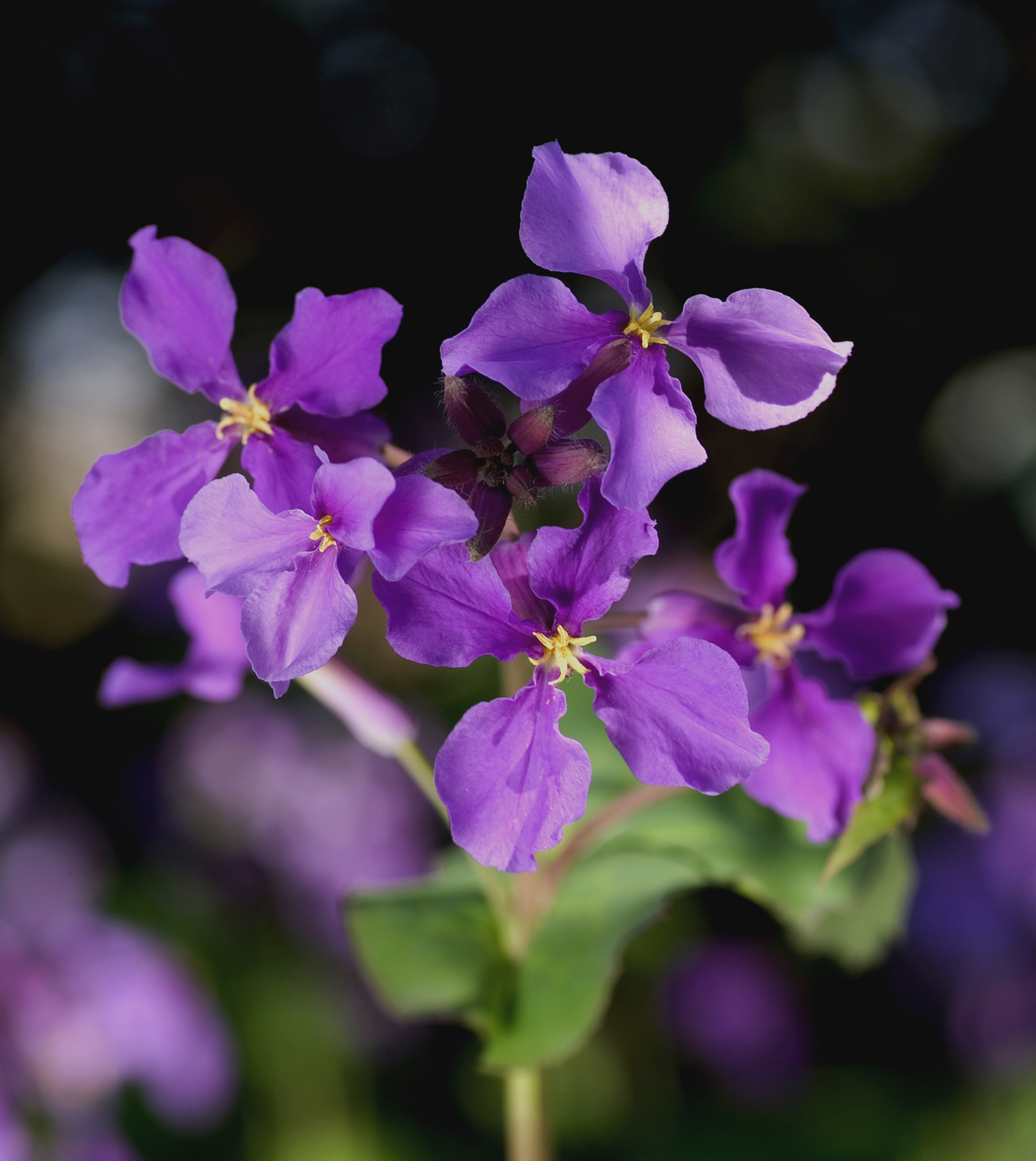
- Orychophragmus violaceus

Scientific classification
- Kingdom: Plantae
- Clade: Tracheophytes
- Clade: Angiosperms
- Clade: Eudicots
- Clade: Rosids
- Order: Brassicales
- Family: Brassicaceae
- Genus: Orychophragmus; Bunge

Species
- 7; see text

= Orychophragmus =

Genus of flowering plants

Orychophragmus is a genus of plants in the family Brassicaceae. It includes seven species native to China and Korea.

== Species ==
Seven species are accepted.

- Orychophragmus diffusus Z.M.Tan & J.M.Xu
- Orychophragmus hupehensis (Pamp.) Z.M.Tan & X.Liang Zhang
- Orychophragmus longisiliquus Huan Hu, J.Quan Liu & Al-Shehbaz
- Orychophragmus taibaiensis Z.M.Tan & B.X.Zhao
- Orychophragmus violaceus (L.) O.E.Schulz
- Orychophragmus zhongtiaoshanus Huan Hu, J.Quan Liu & Al-Shehbaz
- Orychophragmus ziguiensis Z.E.Zhao & J.Q.Wu
