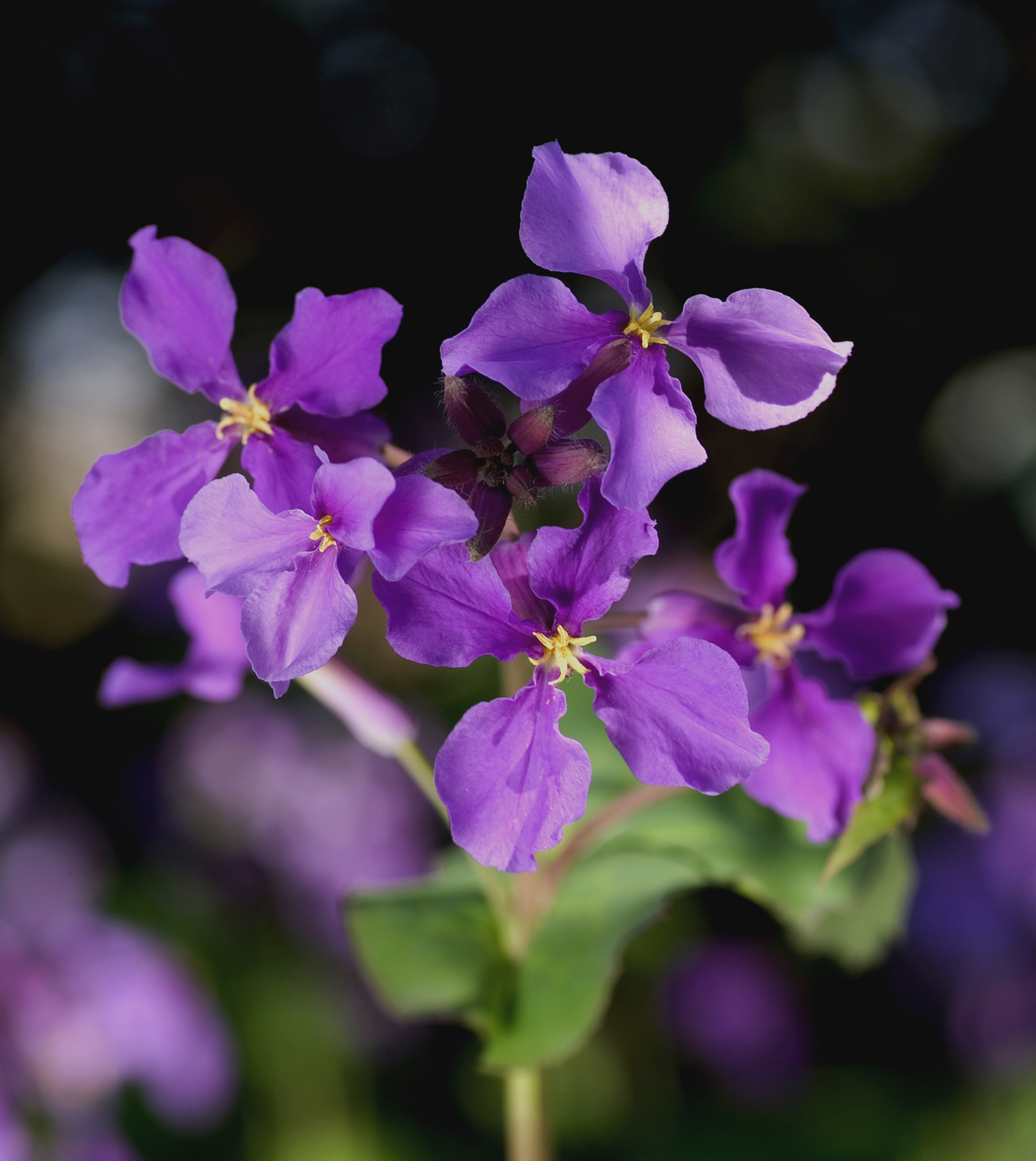
- Close up of flowers
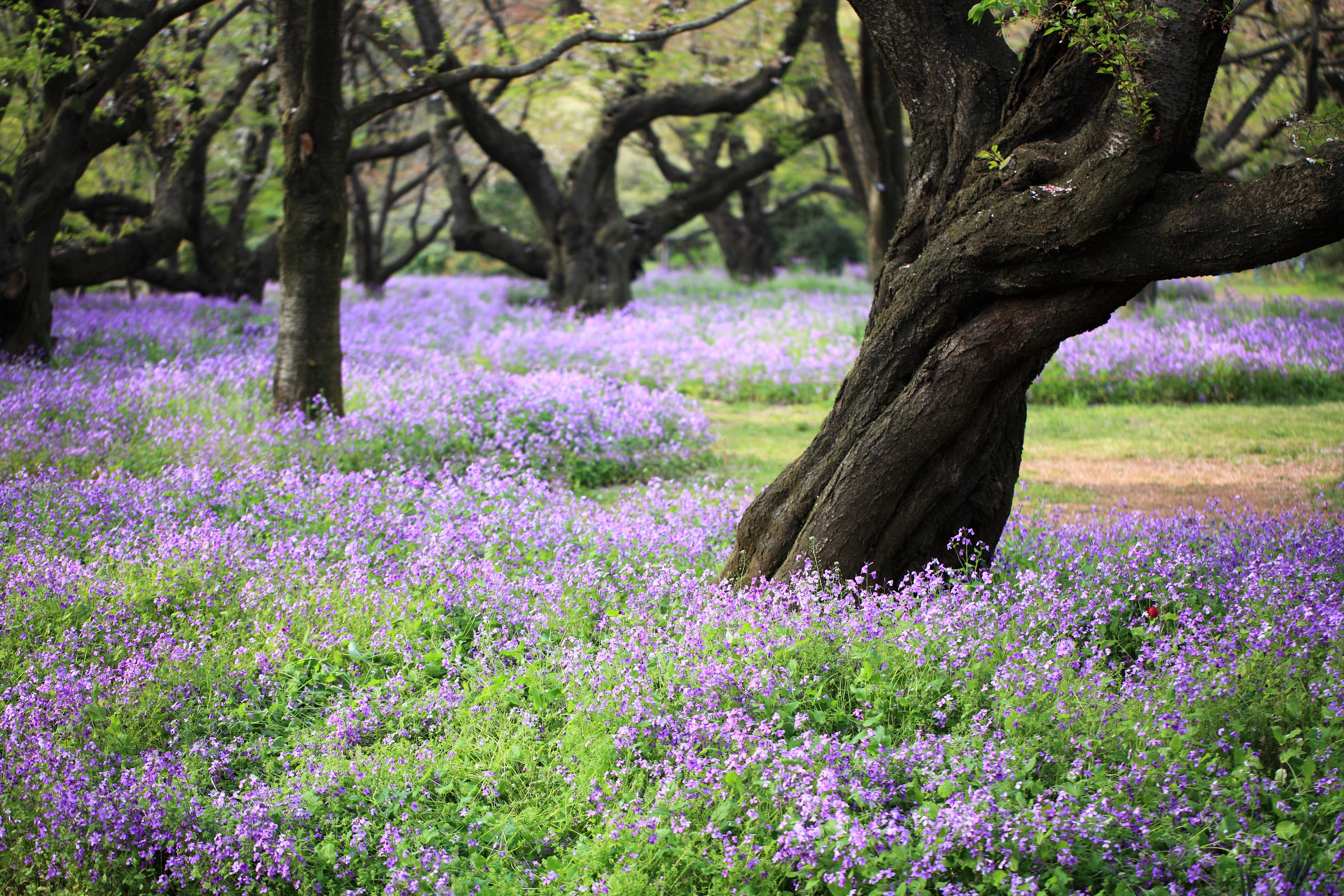
- In Showa Memorial Park

Scientific classification
- Kingdom: Plantae
- Clade: Tracheophytes
- Clade: Angiosperms
- Clade: Eudicots
- Clade: Rosids
- Order: Brassicales
- Family: Brassicaceae
- Genus: Orychophragmus
- Species: O. violaceus

Binomial name
- Orychophragmus violaceus (L.) O.E.Schulz

Synonyms
- List: Arabis chanetii H.Lév.; Brassica violacea L.; Cardamine potentillifolia H.Lév.; Moricandia sonchifolia (Bunge) Ledeb.; Moricandia sonchifolia var. homaeophylla Hance; Orychophragmus sonchifolius Bunge; Orychophragmus sonchifolius var. intermedius Pamp.; Orychophragmus sonchifolius var. subintegrifolius Pamp.; Orychophragmus violaceus var. homaeophylla (Hance) O.E.Schulz; Orychophragmus violaceus var. intermedius (Pamp.) O.E.Schulz; Orychophragmus violaceus var. lasiocarpus Migo; Orychophragmus violaceus var. odontopetalus Ling Wang & Chuan P.Yang; Orychophragmus violaceus var. subintegrifolius (Pamp.) O.E.Schulz; Orychophragmus violaceus var. variegatus Ling Wang & Chuan P.Yang; Raphanus chanetii H.Lév.; Raphanus courtoisii H.Lév.; Raphanus violaceus (L.) Crantz

= Orychophragmus violaceus =

Species of plant

Orychophragmus violaceus, the Chinese violet cress, is a species of flowering plant in the family Brassicaceae. It is native to northern and southeastern China and North Korea, and it has been introduced to Japan and the U.S. state of Virginia. An annual or biennial herb typically 60 cm (24 in) tall, it is found in a wide variety of habitats, including anthropogenically disturbed ones. Hardy in USDA zones 7 through 10, in China it is cultivated as a vegetable for its stalks. The Royal Horticultural Society considers it "potentially harmful".

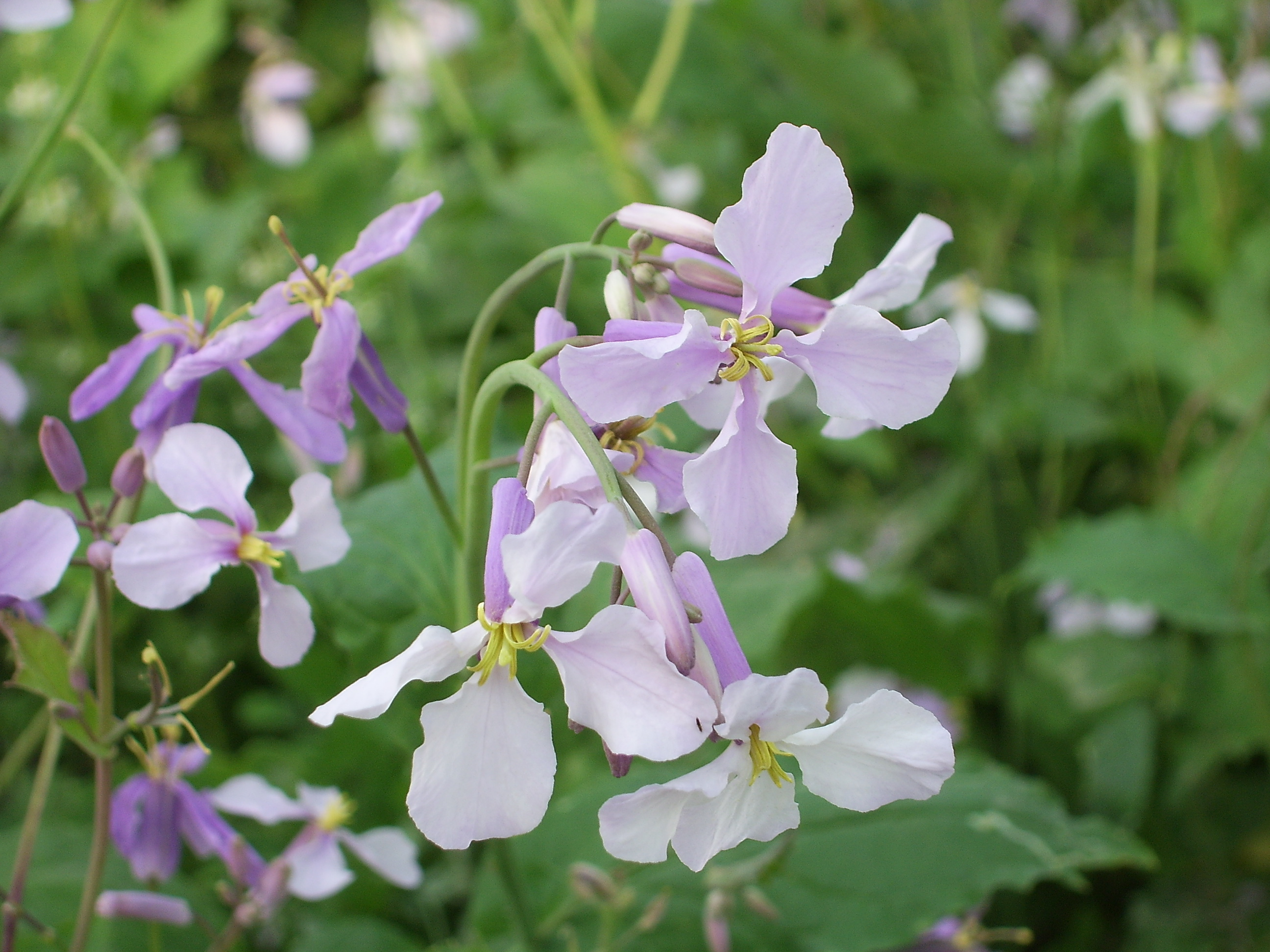
Flowers can be much paler

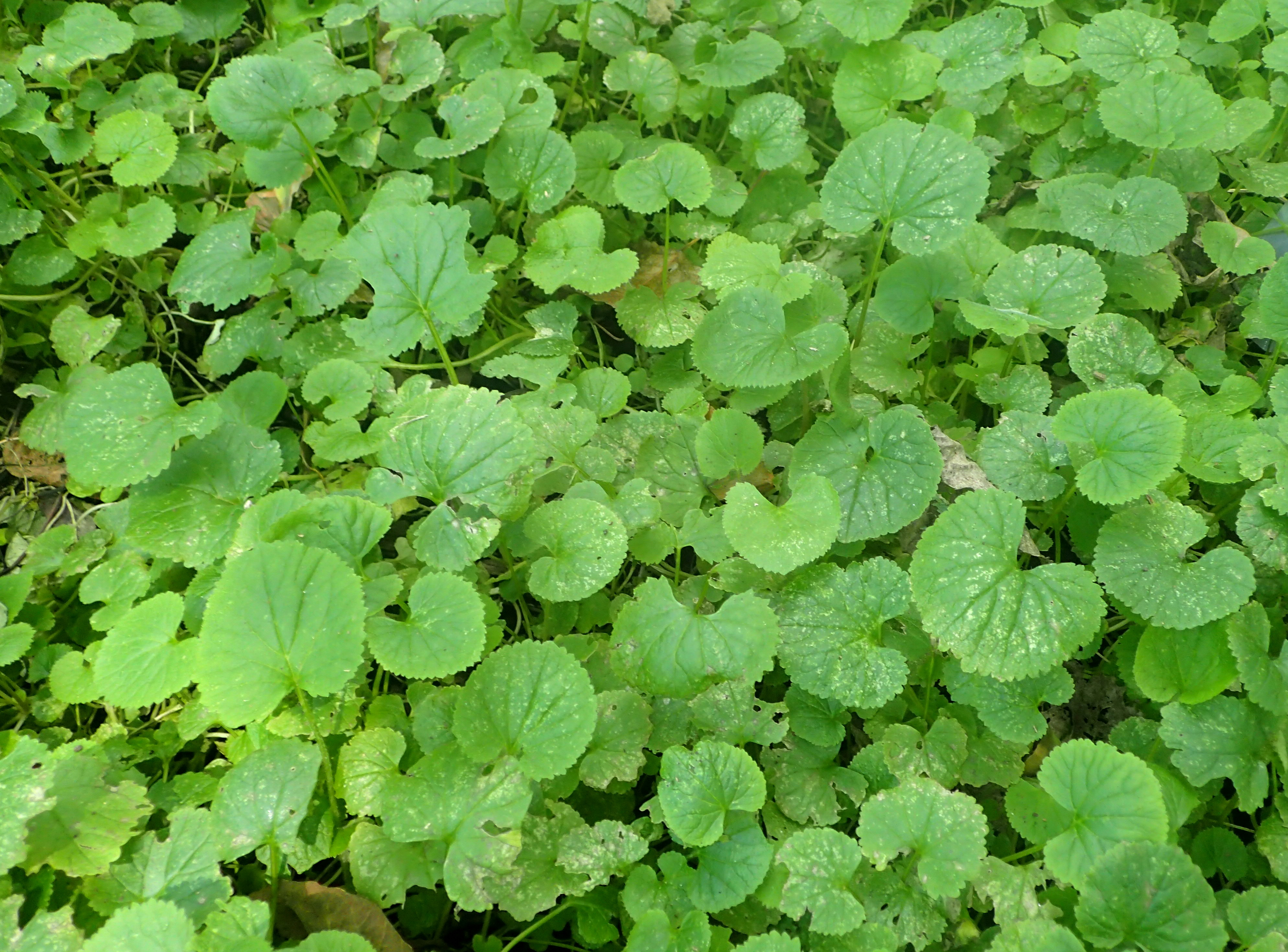
Foliage
