= Tiina Elo =

Finnish politician

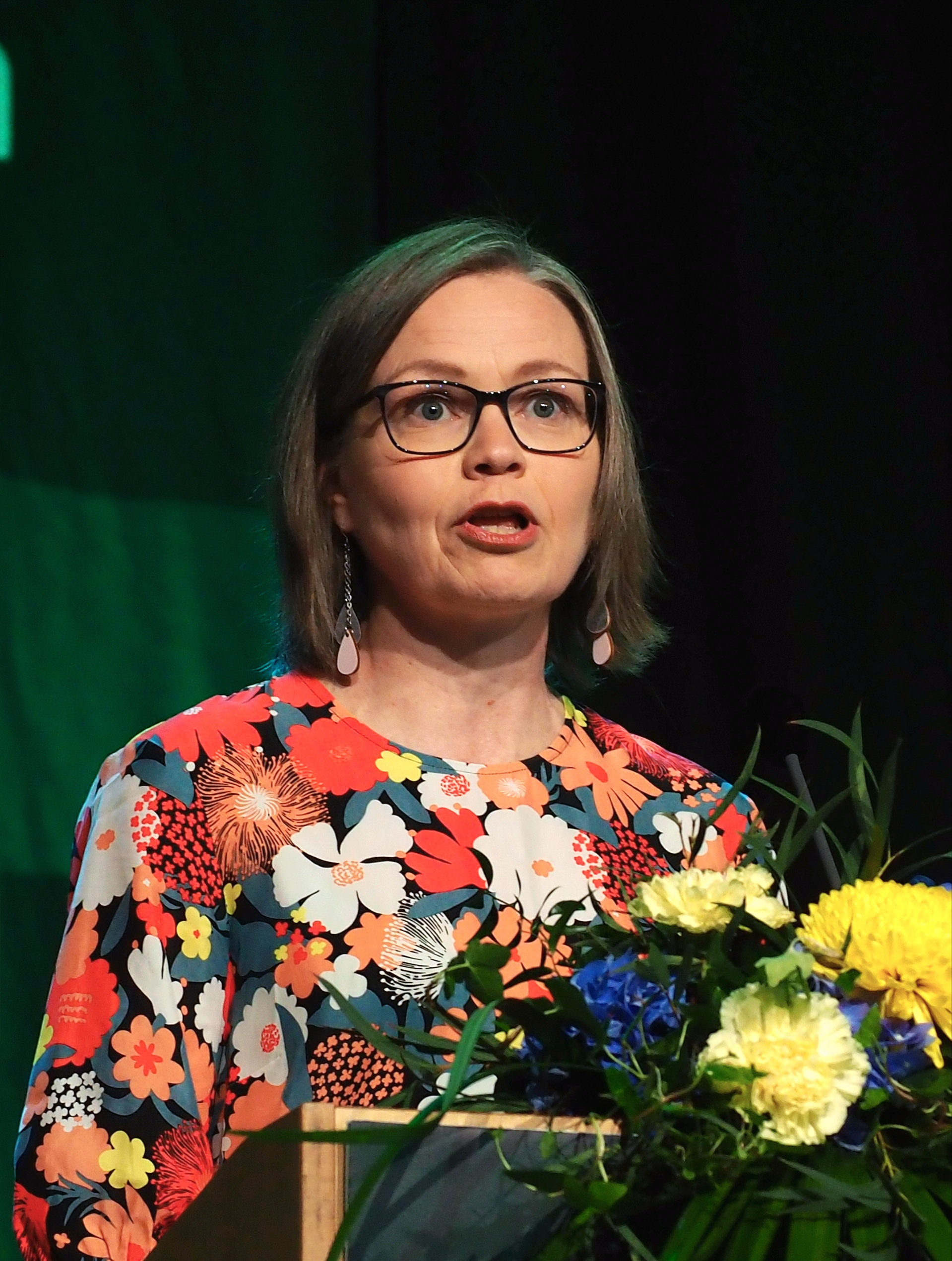
- Tiina Elo in 2023

Member of the Finnish Parliament for Uusimaa

Personal details
- Born: 21 January 1971 (age 55) Helsinki, Uusimaa, Finland
- Party: Green League

Tiina Susanna Elo (born 21 January 1971 in Helsinki) is a Finnish politician currently serving in the Parliament of Finland for the Green League at the Uusimaa constituency.

== Background, education and career ==
Elo was born in Helsinki, but the family moved to Espoo when Elo was three years old. Elo has a Master's degree in Agriculture and Forestry from the University of Helsinki, majoring in Environmental Protection.

Elo has spent most of his career working for the Greens. He has worked as the Executive Director of the Espoo Greens and the Uusimaa Greens, as well as the Greens' Head of Office and Head of Municipal Affairs. Before joining the Greens, Elo worked on projects in environmental education and environmental consultancy for the City of Espoo and organisations.
