= Very-long-chain 3-oxoacyl-CoA synthase =

Class of enzymes

Identifiers
- EC no.: 2.3.1.199

Databases
- BRENDA: enzyme data
- ExPASy: NiceZyme view
- KEGG: enzyme entry
- MetaCyc: metabolic pathway
- Rhea: reactions
- PDB structures: RCSB PDB PDBe PDBsum
Search
- PMC: articles
- PubMed: articles
- NCBI: proteins

Very-long-chain 3-oxoacyl-CoA synthase (EC 2.3.1.199, very-long-chain 3-ketoacyl-CoA synthase, very-long-chain beta-ketoacyl-CoA synthase, condensing enzyme, CUT1, CER6, FAE1, KCS, ELO) is an enzyme with systematic name malonyl-CoA:very-long-chain acyl-CoA malonyltransferase (decarboxylating and thioester-hydrolysing). This enzyme catalyses the following chemical reaction

very-long-chain acyl-CoA + malonyl-CoA $\rightleftharpoons$ very-long-chain 3-oxoacyl-CoA + CO_{2} + coenzyme A

This is the first component of the elongase, a microsomal protein complex responsible for extending palmitoyl-CoA and stearoyl-CoA to very-long-chain acyl CoAs. (Very-long-chain in this context refers, for example, to the C26 fatty acids involved in the synthesis of phospholipids and ceramides.
