= Cer6 (retrotransposon) =

Cer6 is a LTR retrotransposon

Cer6 is a LTR retrotransposon that is described from sequencing data in the chromosome III of C. elegans.

== LTR retrotransposons ==
LTR retrotransposons are class I transposable element characterized by the presence of long terminal repeats (LTRs) directly flanking an internal coding region. As retrotransposons, they mobilize through reverse transcription of their mRNA and integration of the newly created cDNA into another location. Their mechanism of retrotransposition is shared with retroviruses, with the difference that most LTR-retrotransposons do not form infectious particles that leave the cells and therefore only replicate inside their genome of origin.
