= Elongase =

Enzyme that extends the length of fatty acid

Elongase is a generic term for an enzyme that extends the length of fatty acid. The nomenclature is not applied rigorously. Often, elongase refers to enzymes that produce very long chain fatty acids. Sometimes, elongase also includes unsaturases, which introduce C=C double bonds in the backbone. Because fatty acids and their derivatives are biochemically influential, elongases are of considerable interest.

== Biosynthesis of palmitic acid ==
Fatty acids up to C16 in length are produced by fatty acid synthases (FAS's). The starting point is the acetyl derivative of the acyl carrier protein, which adds two-carbon building blocks provided by malonyl coenzyme A (after decarboxylation). This process produces 3-ketoacyl-CoA's as intermediates. The C=O (keto) group is replaced with CH_{2} via a series of steps. This process is repeated up to C16.

== Beyond palmitic acid ==
For a fatty acid to grow in length beyond C16, a second but related class of enzymes involved. but the enzymes are generically called elongases. Six such elongases are recognized. One example is ELOVL4, which elongates long chain fatty acids (LC-FA) into very long-chain saturated (VLC-SFA) and polyunsaturated (VLC-PUFA) fatty acids, collectively known as VLC-FA (very long chain fatty acid).

The starting point for elongation of palmitic acid is palmitoyl-CoA, analogous to acetyl ACP, the starting point for FAS. As in FAS, elongation proceeds by 2-carbon units provided by malonyl-CoA. As in the biosynthesis of palmitic acid, the 3-ketoacyl-CoA is processed to remove the keto group. In this way, stearic acid is produced.

Beyond stearic acid, elongation is followed by unsaturation, leading to polyunsaturated fatty acids. Such species are often precursors to signaling molecules.

== Some elongases-related enzymes ==
- Very-long-chain (3R)-3-hydroxyacyl-(acyl-carrier protein) dehydratase
- Icosanoyl-CoA synthase
