= Elo Sambo =

Cameroonian-born German soldier (1885–1933)

Elo Wilhelm Sambo (1885–1933) was a Cameroonian-born German who served in the Imperial German Army in World War I, notable for being one of very few Africans to do so. He served as the kettle drummer in the Life Guard Hussars of Potsdam (1907–18) and later the 4th Cavalry Regiment of the Reichswehr, also at Potsdam. During his service he was a favorite drummer of German Kaiser Wilhelm II, German Emperor. He was awarded the Iron Cross, first and second class. While serving on the Eastern Front he became wounded and after recuperating joined the German effort with its ally, the Ottoman Empire. It was here he became a POW, returning to Germany in 1919.

== Post war ==
The former German Kaiser Wilhelm II, German Emperor, who abdicated in 1918, was able to use his contacts to get Sambo a job Den Linden in a baby blue uniform as a "taxicab man" at the prestigious Berlin hotel, Hotel Adlon. The paper noted Sambo "is a great linguist and speaks fluent German, even rolling his R's in German fashion.

== See also ==
- German Army order of battle (1914)

== Bibliography ==
Notes

References

- "Ex-Kaiser's First Wedding Favor Is Work for Sambo". Evening Star. Washington D.C. October 15, 1922. p. 100. ISSN 2331-9968. OCLC 974435782.
- Quiroga, Stefan Aguirre (January 19, 2022). White Mythic Space: Racism, the First World War, and Battlefield 1. De Gruyter. ISBN 9783110729306. - Total pages: 174
- Interesting facts about the German Colonies
- Race in the German Army in Africa - Gwynn Compton
