= 3-Oxoacyl-CoA =

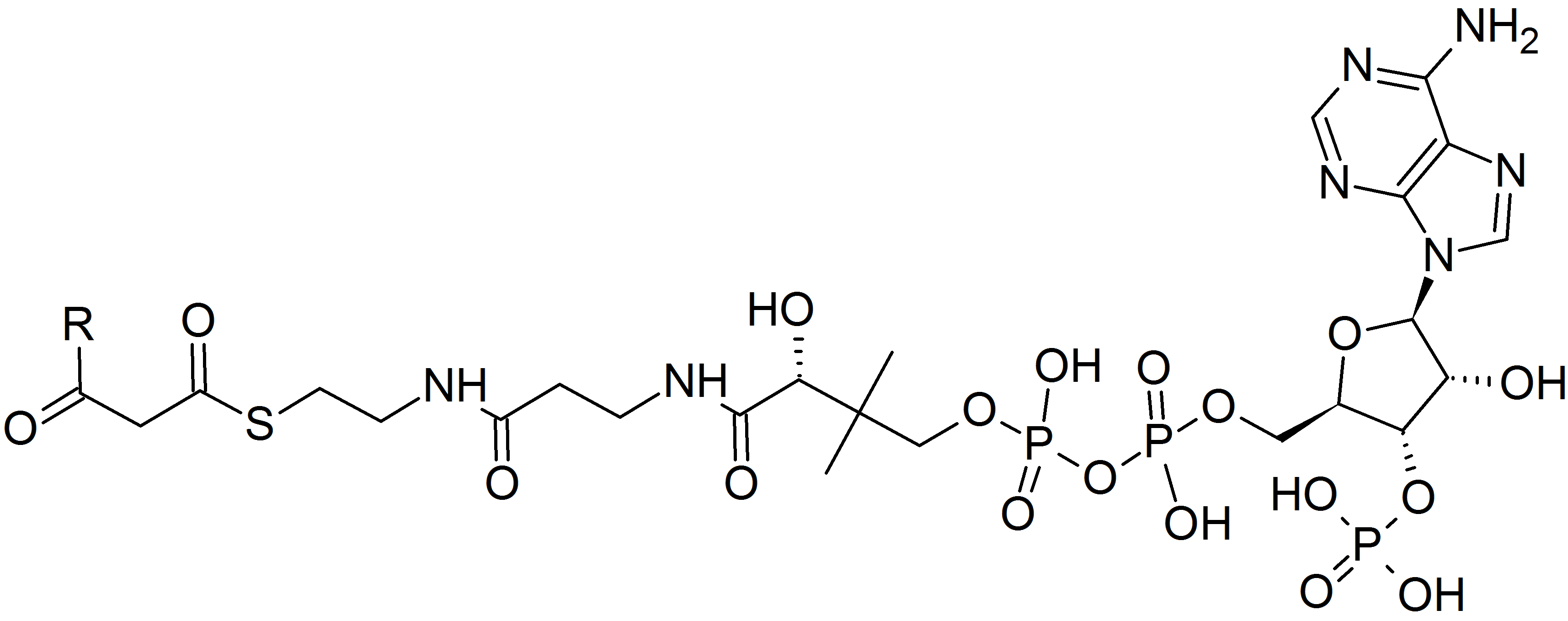

3-Oxoacyl-CoA is a group of coenzymes involved in the metabolism of fatty acids.

== Bibliography ==
- A. W. Schram; et al. (1987). "Human peroxisomal 3-oxoacyl-coenzyme A thiolase deficiency". PNAS. 84 (8): 2494–2496. Bibcode:1987PNAS...84.2494S. doi:10.1073/pnas.84.8.2494. PMC 304678. PMID 2882519.
- Thorpe, Colin (1986). "A method for the preparation of 3-ketoacyl-CoA derivatives". Analytical Biochemistry. 155 (2): 391–394. doi:10.1016/0003-2697(86)90452-5. ISSN 0003-2697. PMID 3728987.
