= Stearoyl-CoA =

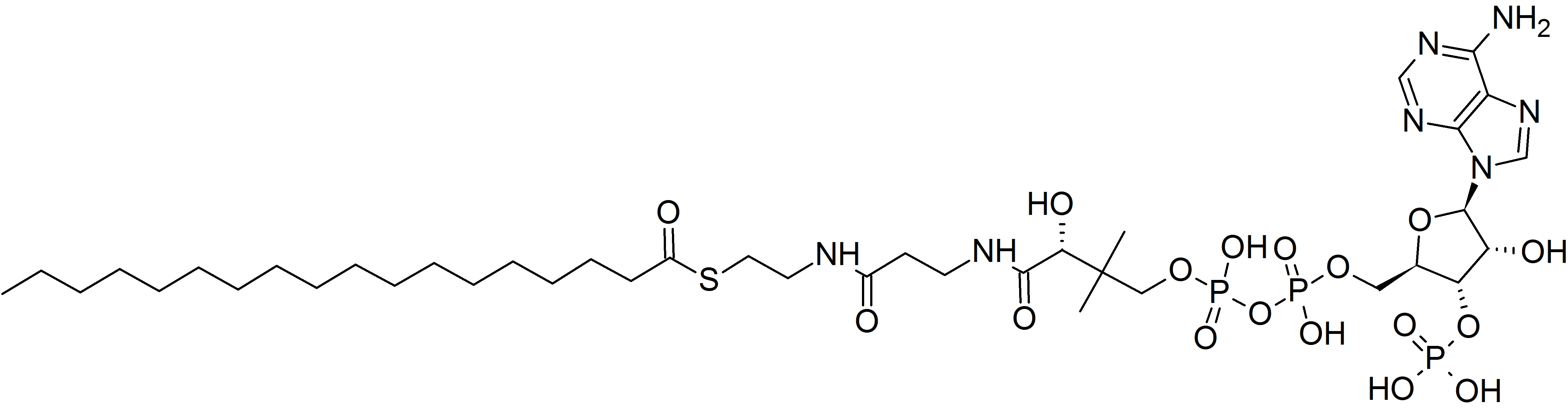

Names
- IUPAC name 3′-O-Phosphonoadenosine 5′-{(3R)-3-hydroxy-2,2-dimethyl-4-[(3-{[2-(octadecanoylsulfanyl)ethyl]amino}-3-oxopropyl)amino]-4-oxobutyl dihydrogen diphosphate}
- Systematic IUPAC name O^{1}-{[(2R,3S,4R,5R)-5-(6-Amino-9H-purin-9-yl)-4-hydroxy-3-(phosphonooxy)oxolan-2-yl]methyl} O^{3}-{(3R)-3-hydroxy-2,2-dimethyl-4-[(3-{[2-(octadecanoylsulfanyl)ethyl]amino}-3-oxopropyl)amino]-4-oxobutyl} dihydrogen diphosphate
- Other names S-Stearoylcoenzyme A, Stearyl-CoA, Octadecanoyl-coenzyme A, Octadecanoyl-CoA, stearyl coenzyme A

Identifiers
CAS Number	362-66-3
3D model (JSmol)	Interactive image
ChEBI	CHEBI:15541
ChemSpider	84957
ECHA InfoCard	100.006.045
KEGG	C00412
PubChem CID	94140
UNII	OBC49BV194
CompTox Dashboard (EPA)	DTXSID80863110
- InChI: InChI=1S/C39H70N7O17P3S/c1-4-5-6-7-8-9-10-11-12-13-14-15-16-17-18-19-30(48)67-23-22-41-29(47)20-21-42-37(51)34(50)39(2,3)25-60-66(57,58)63-65(55,56)59-24-28-33(62-64(52,53)54)32(49)38(61-28)46-27-45-31-35(40)43-26-44-36(31)46/h26-28,32-34,38,49-50H,4-25H2,1-3H3,(H,41,47)(H,42,51)(H,55,56)(H,57,58)(H2,40,43,44)(H2,52,53,54)/t28-,32-,33-,34+,38-/m1/s1 Key: SIARJEKBADXQJG-LFZQUHGESA-N
- SMILES: CCCCCCCCCCCCCCCCCC(=O)SCCNC(=O)CCNC(=O)[C@@H](C(C)(C)COP(=O)(O)OP(=O)(O)OC[C@@H]1[C@H]([C@H]([C@@H](O1)N2C=NC3=C2N=CN=C3N)O)OP(=O)(O)O)O

Properties
Chemical formula	C_{39}H_{70}N_{7}O_{17}P_{3}S
Molar mass	1034.00 g·mol^{−1}
- Except where otherwise noted, data are given for materials in their standard state (at 25 °C [77 °F], 100 kPa). Infobox references

Stearoyl-CoA is a coenzyme involved in the metabolism of fatty acids. Stearoyl-CoA is an 18-carbon long fatty acyl-CoA chain that participates in an unsaturation reaction. The reaction is catalyzed by the enzyme stearoyl-CoA desaturase, which is located in the endoplasmic reticulum. It forms a cis-double bond between the ninth and tenth carbons within the chain to form the product oleoyl-CoA.

== Bibliography ==
- Miyazaki, M. (2000). "The Biosynthesis of Hepatic Cholesterol Esters and Triglycerides Is Impaired in Mice with a Disruption of the Gene for Stearoyl-CoA Desaturase 1". Journal of Biological Chemistry. 275 (39): 30132–30138. doi:10.1074/jbc.M005488200. PMID 10899171.
