= C18H28O2 =

The molecular formula C_{18}H_{28}O_{2} (molar mass : 276.41 g/mol exact mass : 276.20893) may refer to:

- Bolandiol (19-norandrostenediol)
- Coniferonic acid
- Utreloxastat
- 5α-Dihydronandrolone
- 19-Norandrosterone
- 19-Noretiocholanolone
- Octadecatetraenoic acid
  - alpha-Parinaric acid
  - Coniferonic acid
  - Stearidonic acid, an essential fatty acid
