= Octadecatetraenoic acid =

(9Z,11E,13E,15Z)-Octadeca-9,11,13,15-tetraenoic acid (α-parinaric acid)

An octadecatetraenoic acid is a chemical compound with formula C_{18}H_{28}O_{2}, a polyunsaturated fatty acid whose molecule has an 18-carbon unbranched backbone with four double bonds.

The name refers to different structural and configurational isomers, that differ in the position of the double bonds and on whether they are in cis (Z) or trans (E) configuration. Some isomers have considerable biological, pharmaceutical, or industrial importance, such as:

- α-Parinaric acid (9Z,11E,13E,15Z), found in the seeds of the makita tree (Parinari laurina)
- Stearidonic acid (6Z,9Z,12Z,15Z), an essential fatty acid
- Coniferonic acid (5Z,9Z,12Z,15Z), found in Larix decidua
