= Atuna cordata =

Conservation status
- Least Concern (IUCN 3.1)

Scientific classification
- Kingdom: Plantae
- Clade: Tracheophytes
- Clade: Angiosperms
- Clade: Eudicots
- Clade: Rosids
- Order: Malpighiales
- Family: Chrysobalanaceae
- Genus: Atuna
- Species: A. cordata

Binomial name
- Atuna cordata Cockburn ex Prance

Species of tree

Atuna cordata is a tree in the Atuna genus of the family Chrysobalanaceae. The specific epithet cordata is from the Latin meaning "heart-shaped", referring to the leaf base.

== Description ==
Atuna cordata grows up to 40 metres (130 ft) tall. The smooth bark is grey-green with white mottles. The ovoid fruits measure up to 6 cm (2 in) long.

== Distribution and habitat ==
Atuna cordata is endemic to Borneo where it is confined to Sabah. Its habitat is on ultramafic soils from sea-level to 1,200 metres (4,000 ft) elevation.
