= Sciadonic acid =

Names
- IUPAC name (5Z,11Z,14Z)-Icosa-5,11,14-trienoic acid
- Other names: Eicosatrienoic acid; 5Z,11Z,14Z-eicosatrienoic acid; All-cis-5,11,14-eicosatrienoic acid

Identifiers
CAS Number	7019-85-4
3D model (JSmol)	Interactive image
ChEBI	CHEBI:82832
ChemSpider	392828
PubChem CID	445084
UNII	69Y3H52QB5
CompTox Dashboard (EPA)	DTXSID601317197
- InChI: InChI=1S/C20H34O2/c1-2-3-4-5-6-7-8-9-10-11-12-13-14-15-16-17-18-19-20(21)22/h6-7,9-10,15-16H,2-5,8,11-14,17-19H2,1H3,(H,21,22)/b7-6-,10-9-,16-15- Key: PRHHYVQTPBEDFE-URZBRJKDSA-N
- SMILES: CCCCC/C=C\C/C=C\CCCC/C=C\CCCC(=O)O

Properties
Chemical formula	C_{20}H_{34}O_{2}
Molar mass	306.490 g·mol^{−1}
Density	0.9 g·cm^{−3}
Boiling point	432 °C (810 °F; 705 K)
log P	7.59
Refractive index (n_{D})	1.489

Hazards
Flash point	329 °C (624 °F; 602 K)
- Except where otherwise noted, data are given for materials in their standard state (at 25 °C [77 °F], 100 kPa). Infobox references

Sciadonic acid, also known as eicosatrienoic acid, is a polyunsaturated fatty acid. In regard to its structure, sciadonic acid has 3 double bonds in the 5, 11, and 14 positions all of which are in the cis configuration. It is further classified as Δ^{5}-fatty, and an omega-6 acid due to the methylene interrupted double bond at carbon-5 and a final double bond 6 carbons away from the methylene tail of the hydrocarbon. Sciadonic acid is a naturally occurring compound and has been found to play a role as a plant metabolite, commonly found in pine nut oil. Furthermore, there have been propositions of several health applications for sciadonic acid as an anti-inflammatory agent. Sharing close structural similarity to arachidonic acid, sciadonic acid acts as a replacement phospholipid in the corresponding biochemical pathways.

== Etymology and natural occurrence ==
The root behind the nomenclature of sciadonic acid comes from its high abundance in the seed, leaves, and wood oils of the plant species Sciadopitys verticillata.

Oftentimes, the acid is found in conifers together with other fatty acids (juniperonic, pinolenic, taxoleic, coniferonic acid) that have a double bond in the position 5, separated by more than one methylene group from the next double bond.

== Synthetic methods ==
There are a few methods reagarding the synthesis of sciadonic acid and other Δ5-fatty acids. One method is through desaturase enzyme complexes in which the biosynthesis of sciadonic acid has been achieved in the organism Anemone leveillei via two Δ^{5}-desaturases, AL10 and AL21. Both desaturases have shown success in the synthesis of sciadonic acid, however, the mechanisms show different substrate specificity. AL21 has broad substrate specificity and acts on both saturated (16:0 and 18:0) and unsaturated (20:2, ω-6) fatty acids. In contrast AL10 has a much greater substrate specificity binding only to a C20 unsaturated fatty acid (20:2, n-6) When AL10 is co-expressed with a Δ^{9}-elongase the biosynthesis of sciadonic acid is achieved in transgenic plants. A second synthetic method is achieved through an esterification reaction catalyzed via Lipozyme RM IM and pine nut oil. Lipase-catalyzed esterification reactions leading to the development of Δ^{5}-fatty acids can be achieved in solvent-free conditions using water-jacketed vessel.

== Phylogenetic significance in gymnosperms ==
Sciadonic acid and several other Δ^{5}-olefinic acids are found to be relatively abundant in gymnosperms. Setaria verticillata seeds and their fatty acid compositions allow for distinction between different Coniferophytes such as species from families such as Cupressaceae and Taxodiaceae. Sciadonic acid is a distinctive fatty acid that shows presence in the oils of seeds, leaves, and woods of conifers. Indicating that plant families can be characterized by the fatty acid composition of their seed, leaves, and wood oils.

== Health implications ==
Eicosanoids and metabolites found to be biologically active have correlated to tumor progression by several mechanisms such as interruption of cell signaling. In humans, fatty acid desaturases, FADS 1,2 and 3 are enzyme coding genes found in the 11q13 region of chromosome 11, in which alterations can be attributed to several types of cancers such as breast, ovarian and cervical cancer. In particular, the FADS2 enzyme, responsible for Δ^{6} desaturation is no longer functional. In healthy tissues sciadonic acid is usually not within detectable concentrations. However, detectable concentrations have been found in human breast cancer tissues and in pooled human blood plasma. Due to structural similarity, Sciadonic acid has shown potential as a substitute for arachidonic acid in cellular phospholipid pools in signaling pathways. In keratinocytes, sciadonic acids release from the cellular membrane phospholipid pool reduces levels of pro-inflammatory arachidonic acid and the corresponding pro-inflammatory down-stream mediator prostaglandin E_{2}. Reduction of pro-inflammatory mediator molecules also occurs in murine macrophages, regulating the activation of NF-κΒ and MAPK pathways.
