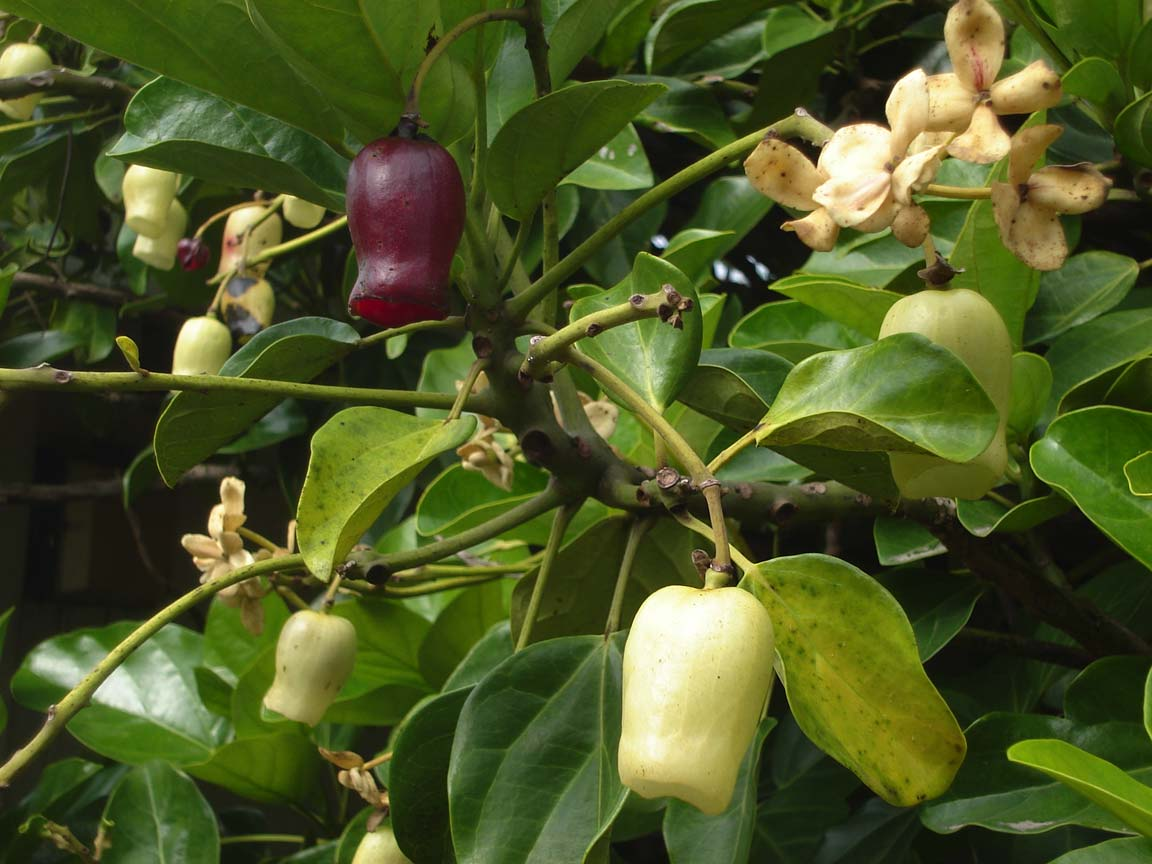

Scientific classification
- Kingdom: Plantae
- Clade: Tracheophytes
- Clade: Angiosperms
- Clade: Eudicots
- Clade: Rosids
- Order: Malpighiales
- Family: Chrysobalanaceae
- Genus: Atuna
- Species: A. racemosa Raf.
- Subspecies: A. r. subsp. racemosa

Trinomial name
- Atuna racemosa subsp. racemosa

Synonyms
- Parinari glaberimma (Hassk.) Hassk.; Parinari laurina A.Gray; and several others

= Atuna racemosa subsp. racemosa =

Subspecies of flowering plant

Atuna racemosa subsp. racemosa is a subspecies of Atuna racemosa, a plant species in the family Chrysobalanaceae.

It is a tree of moderate size, widespread over the Indo-Malaysian and South Pacific areas. It is found growing in such places as Papua New Guinea (kusta), Java, Borneo, Truk Islands (ais) and prolifically on the sea front and in the river valleys of Fiji (makita). This tree once provided the timber for the spars of canoes. The ovoid fruit which this tree bears have been used for medicinal purposes (Truk Is.), or as a glue and varnish in food bowl manufacture (Solomon Is.). Its seeds are a major source of alpha-Parinaric acid, a conjugated polyunsaturated fatty acid with various uses.
