= Atuna elliptica =

Conservation status
- Near Threatened (IUCN 3.1)

Scientific classification
- Kingdom: Plantae
- Clade: Tracheophytes
- Clade: Angiosperms
- Clade: Eudicots
- Clade: Rosids
- Order: Malpighiales
- Family: Chrysobalanaceae
- Genus: Atuna
- Species: A. elliptica

Binomial name
- Atuna elliptica (Kosterm.) Kosterm.

Synonyms
- Cyclandrophora elliptica (Kosterm.) Kosterm. & Prance; Parinari elliptica Kosterm.

Species of flowering plant

Atuna elliptica is a species of flowering plant in the family Chrysobalanaceae. It is a tree endemic to Viti Levu in Fiji.
