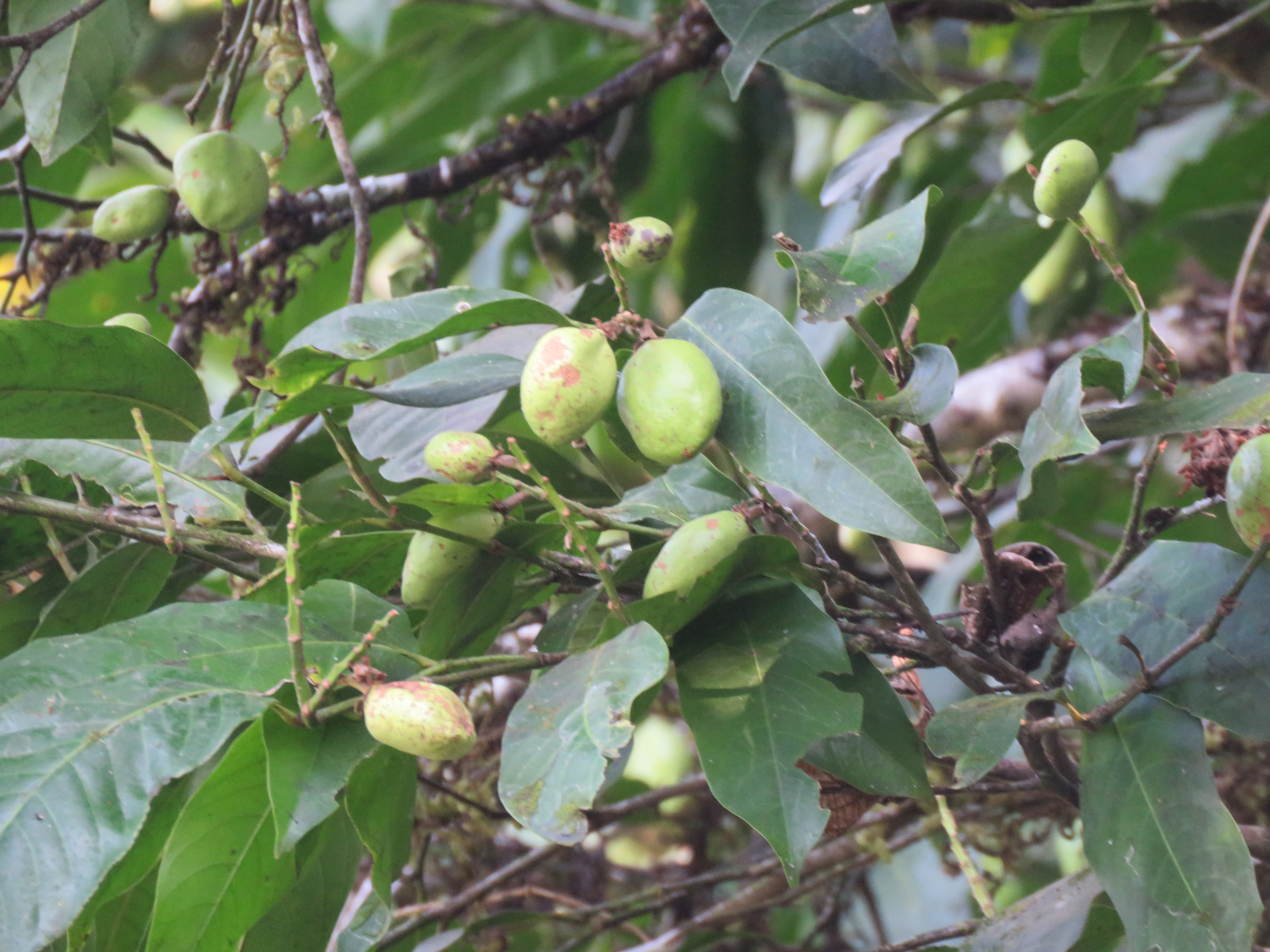
- Atuna indica at Kakkayam Dam, Kerala

Conservation status
- Endangered (IUCN 2.3)

Scientific classification
- Kingdom: Plantae
- Clade: Tracheophytes
- Clade: Angiosperms
- Clade: Eudicots
- Clade: Rosids
- Order: Malpighiales
- Family: Chrysobalanaceae
- Genus: Atuna
- Species: A. indica

Binomial name
- Atuna indica (Bedd.) Kosterm.

Synonyms
- Cyclandrophora indica (Bedd.) Prance ex Kosterm.; Entosiphon indicum Bedd. (1864); Ferolia indica (Bedd.) Kuntze; Parinari indica (Bedd.) Bedd.

= Atuna indica =

Species of flowering plant

Atuna indica is a species of flowering plant in the family Chrysobalanaceae. It is endemic to the Nilgiri Hills of Tamil Nadu in southern India. It has been recorded only twice from a small area in the north-west of the Nilgiris, where it grows in submontane evergreen forest.

The species was first described as Entosiphon indicum by Richard Henry Beddome in 1864. In 1969 André Joseph Guillaume Henri Kostermans placed the species in genus Atuna as A. indica.
