= Atuna penangiana =

Conservation status
- Vulnerable (IUCN 2.3)

Scientific classification
- Kingdom: Plantae
- Clade: Tracheophytes
- Clade: Angiosperms
- Clade: Eudicots
- Clade: Rosids
- Order: Malpighiales
- Family: Chrysobalanaceae
- Genus: Atuna
- Species: A. penangiana

Binomial name
- Atuna penangiana (Kosterm. & Prance) Kosterm.

Synonyms
- Cyclandrophora penangiana Kosterm. & Prance

Species of tree

Atuna penangiana is a species of flowering plant in the family Chrysobalanaceae. It is a tree endemic to Peninsular Malaysia. It is threatened by habitat loss.
