= Atuna travancorica =

Conservation status
- Critically Endangered (IUCN 3.1)

Scientific classification
- Kingdom: Plantae
- Clade: Tracheophytes
- Clade: Angiosperms
- Clade: Eudicots
- Clade: Rosids
- Order: Malpighiales
- Family: Chrysobalanaceae
- Genus: Atuna
- Species: A. travancorica

Binomial name
- Atuna travancorica (Bedd.) Kosterm.

Synonyms
- Cyclandrophora travancorica (Bedd.) Prance ex Kosterm.; Ferolia travancorica (Bedd.) Kuntze; Parinari travancorica Bedd.

Species of flowering plant

Atuna travancorica is a species of flowering plant in the family Chrysobalanaceae. It is endemic to the Western Ghats of Tamil Nadu in southern India. It is threatened by habitat loss.
