= Coniferonic acid =

Names
- IUPAC name (5Z,9Z,12Z,15Z)-octadecatetraenoic acid

Identifiers
3D model (JSmol)	Interactive image
ChEBI	CHEBI:86135
ChemSpider	34999888
PubChem CID	13751481
- InChI: InChI=1S/C18H28O2/c1-2-3-4-5-6-7-8-9-10-11-12-13-14-15-16-17-18(19)20/h3-4,6-7,9-10,13-14H,2,5,8,11-12,15-17H2,1H3,(H,19,20)/b4-3-,7-6-,10-9-,14-13- Key: DNOBNGNBPVOMLW-XRPCLMINSA-N
- SMILES: CCC=CCC=CCC=CCCC=CCCCC(=O)O

Properties
Chemical formula	C_{18}H_{28}O_{2}
Molar mass	276.420 g·mol^{−1}
- Except where otherwise noted, data are given for materials in their standard state (at 25 °C [77 °F], 100 kPa). Infobox references

Coniferonic acid is a polyunsaturated fatty acid composed of 18 carbon atoms with four double bonds, in positions 5=6, 9=10, 12=13, 15=16; all in cis-configuration.

== Discovery and natural occurrence ==
The acid has been isolated in the leaves of conifers, from which it took its common name. The species with the highest concentration are Larix decidua containing about 44% of the total fatty acids, Abies grandis (≈38%), Araucaria montana (≈8.9%), and Abies veitchii (≈7.8%).

It is also found in the seed oil of Korean pine or Pinus koraiensis (≈14.6%) and Fokienia hodginsii (≈2.8%).

Oftentimes, it is found in conifers together with other fatty acids (juniperonic, pinolenic, taxoleic, sciadonic acid) that have a double bond in the position 5, separated by more than one methylene group from the next double bond.

== Biosynthesis ==
The acid is assumed to be biosynthesized from α-linolenic acid by the enzyme Δ5-desaturase. The ratio of the concentration of coniferonic acid to that of α-linolenic acid allows the taxonomic differentiation of some plant genera.
