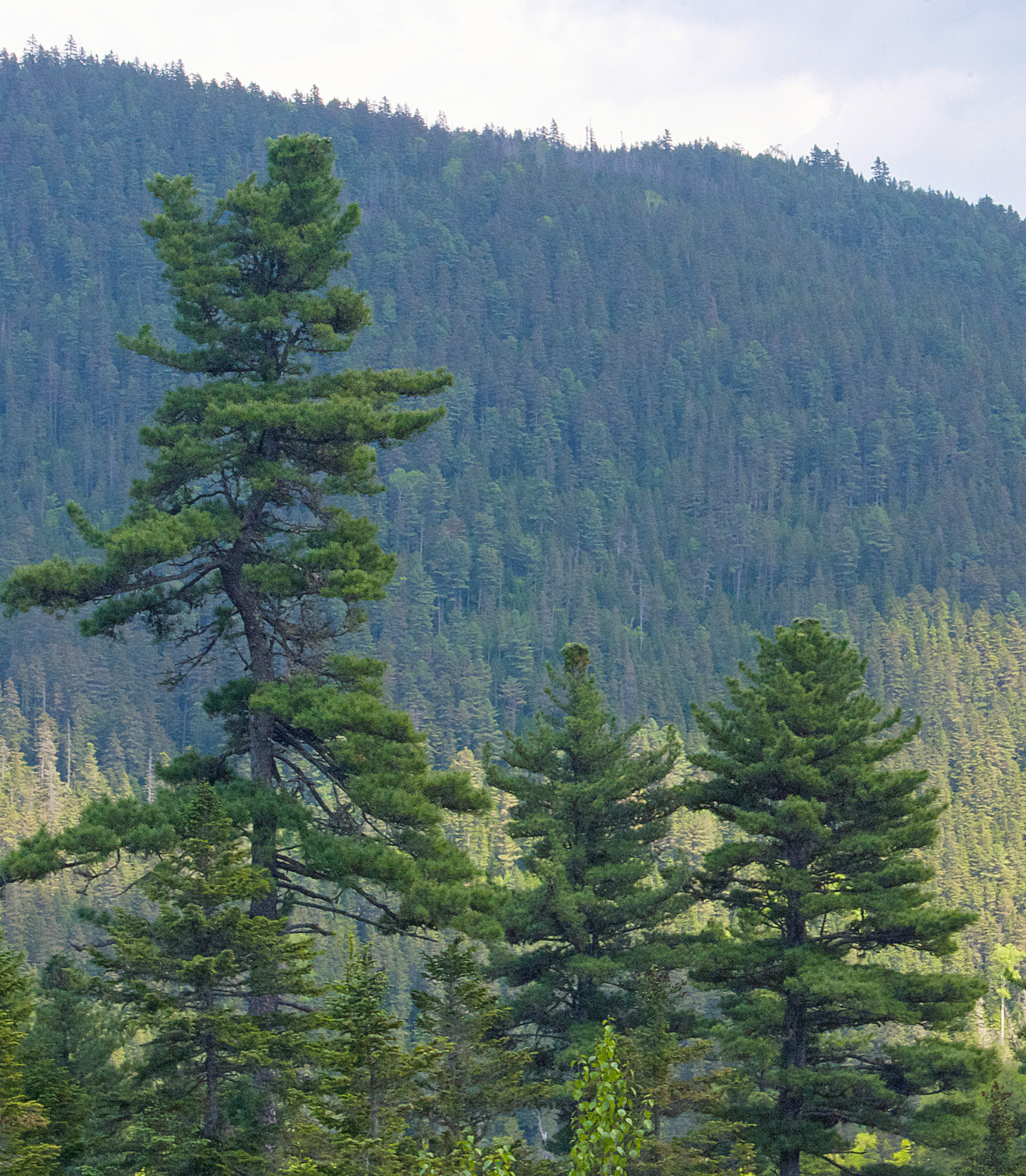
- Trees at Cheremshany, Sikhote Alin, Russia

Conservation status
- Least Concern (IUCN 3.1)
- CITES Appendix III

Scientific classification
- Kingdom: Plantae
- Clade: Embryophytes
- Clade: Tracheophytes
- Clade: Spermatophytes
- Clade: Gymnospermae
- Division: Pinophyta
- Class: Pinopsida
- Order: Pinales
- Family: Pinaceae
- Genus: Pinus
- Subgenus: P. subg. Strobus
- Section: P. sect. Quinquefoliae
- Subsection: P. subsect. Strobus
- Species: P. koraiensis

Binomial name
- Pinus koraiensis Siebold & Zucc.

= Pinus koraiensis =

Species of conifer

Pinus koraiensis is a species of pine known commonly as the Korean pine. It is a relic species of the Tertiary, identified as a rare tree species by United Nations. It is native to eastern Asia, in Korea, northeastern China, the temperate rainforests of the Russian Far East, and central Japan. In the north of its range, it grows at moderate elevations, typically 600 to 900 metres (2,000 to 3,000 feet), whereas further south, it is a mountain tree, growing at 2,000 to 2,600 m (6,600 to 8,500 ft) elevation in Japan. Other common names include "Chinese pinenut". The ancient woodland of P. koraiensis on the earth is about 50 million hectares, and China has about 30 million hectares, accounting for 60%. It is a second-class national key protected plant in China. P. koraiensis is a tree species with high economic and ecological value. The official name in Chinese is "红松 hóng sōng/red pine", because almost every part of it is related to red.

According to some research, P. koraiensis can be divided into two natural types according to the thickness of the bark, namely Pinus koraiensis Sieb. et Zucc. f. pachidermis Wang et Chi and Pinus koraiensis Sieb. et Zucc. f. leptodermis Wang et Chi, though these are not accepted as distinct by the Plants of the World Online database.

== Description ==
P. koraiensis is a member of the white pine group, Pinus, section Quinquefoliae. In their native habitat and growing conditions it grows to 20–35 m (66–115 ft) tall, rarely to 50 m (160 ft) in height. Cultivated specimens are usually smaller, to around 20 m (66 ft) tall. The tree is broad conical when young, becoming columnar with a conic apex with age; younger specimens having ascending branches and older trees having more horizontal branches. The grey or brownish bark flakes off to reveal reddish inner bark. The sapwood is yellowish white, while the heartwood is light yellowish-brown or light reddish-brown. The branchlets and winter buds are also reddish-brown. The branches are lined with blue-green needles in bundles of five, each up to 6–13 cm (2.4–5.1 in) long, with dark glossy green outer faces and glaucous white stomatal bands on the inner faces. P. koraiensis is monoecious with separate male and female cones. The male (pollen) cones are reddish-yellow, mostly clustered in the lower part of new branches to form spikes; pollination is in spring. The seed cones are 9–14 cm (3.5–5.5 in) long, rarely 20 cm (7.9 in) long, and 6–8 cm (2.4–3.1 in) diameter, rarely 10 cm (3.9 in) diameter; they are solitary or in groups near the top of new branches, green or purple when immature, ripening grey-brown in early autumn. The seeds take about 18 months from pollination to maturity; the mature seeds do not fall out of the cones, but are dispersed by birds, primarily the northern nutcracker (Nucifraga caryocatactes), which collects the seeds in autumn and disperses them. The nutshells are reddish brown. P. koraiensis can live up to 700 years; after 100–200 years of growth, it enters the fruitful youth stage, and after 300–400 years, it enters the fruitful adult stage. In the wild, P. koraiensis grows slowly, taking fifty or even eighty years to bear cones, and cultivated P. koraiensis usually takes more than twenty years to bear cones, but grafted seedlings can bear cones within a few years.

== Conservation ==
The value of P. koraiensis has led to overexploitation of wild populations of the tree, and destruction of the forest ecosystems in which it grows. The Siberian tiger is resident in these pine forests, and preservation of this tree species is one step in the conservation of the tiger.

Other associates of the tree in nature include the northern nutcracker, which collects the seeds and plays an important role in their dispersal.

In China, the ancient P. koraiensis forests are concentrated in the Paektu Mountain and Lesser Khingan areas, and are the building species of the natural forests in the northeast. Except for the pure P. koraiensis forests in some areas, most of them are mixed with other coniferous and broad-leaved tree species. The broad-leaved-P. koraiensis forest preserves the ancient structural characteristics of the Tertiary plant community. It is a climax community in northeastern China, and its ecological value is extremely precious. It maintains ecological balance and ecological security in northeastern China. Yichun located in Lesser Khingan has the most typical and best-preserved P. koraiensis virgin forest community in Asia. Yichun has two national nature reserves, 丰林/Fenglin and 涼水/Liangshui, which specialize in the protection of P. koraiensis. Among them, Fenglin Nature Reserve has been included in the World Network of Biosphere Reserves" by UNESCO. The P. koraiensis virgin forest community in Yichun is an important gene pool of China's biodiversity. "There are more than 110 kinds of precious coniferous and broad-leaved trees, more than 60 kinds of large mammalian wild animals, and more than 270 kinds of birds, including 64 kinds of national first-class and second-class protected animals; there are 1390 kinds of plants, including more than 700 kinds of wild medicinal materials". Since 2004, the logging of wild P. koraiensis trees has been completely prohibited in Yichun, and the existing P. koraiensis trees have been registered one by one for protection.

== Uses ==
P. koraiensis is a precious tree species with both economic and ecological value. Ecologically, it has the functions of water and soil conservation – its root having a large water storage capacity, which is a "small reservoir" in the eyes of ecologists – and the function of maintaining biodiversity. Economically, every part of the plant can be used. In China, it has a long history of being used in food, beverage, health preservation and medical treatment. The ancients called its fruit "長壽果/longevity fruit". The traditional Chinese medicine "海松子/sea-pine nut" refers to the seeds of P. koraiensis, which is a nourishing and strengthening agent. At present, the high-tech industry of P. koraiensis has outstanding achievements in the fields of food, health products, medicine, cosmetics and fine chemicals.

The nuts of this tree are edible and sold commercially. It is the most common taxon sold as pine nuts in markets throughout Europe and the United States. The nut oil contains 11.5% of the unusual fatty acid pinolenic acid (cis–5–cis–9–cis–12 octadecatrienoic acid). It "has a variety of physiological effects such as weight loss, lipid lowering, immune enhancement, anti-inflammation, anti-oxidation, enhancement of insulin sensitivity, and anti-tumor metastasis." Pine nut oil extracted from P. koraiensis nuts has high nutritional value. The oil is also used to make lubricants and soap. The tree is a source of turpentine resin and tannin. The pine needles can be used to extract pine needle oil.

Pine pollen (松花粉) is the dried pollen produced by the pollen cones. It is a traditional Chinese medicine and a traditional Chinese cooking ingredient. It is even used as the name of cakes or drinks, such as "松花糕/pine flower cake", "松花酒/pine flower wine" etc. ""中国预防医学科学院营养与食品卫生研究所/The Institute of Nutrition and Food Hygiene of the Chinese Academy of Preventive Medicine" has confirmed that pine pollen contains more than 200 nutritional components and bioactive substances, with anti-fatigue, anti-aging, regulating blood lipids, enhancing immunity, and beautifying five major health care functions". ""国家体育总局运动医学研究所兴奋剂检测中心/The Doping Testing Center of the Institute of Sports Medicine of China" indicated that no ingredients banned by the Olympic Games were found in pine pollen".

The Korean pine is used as an ornamental tree. It is tolerant of several soil types and thrives in urban settings. It is adapted to climates with very cold winters. There are several cultivars, including the blue-tinged 'Glauca' and 'Silveray' and the wide-bodied 'Winton'. The Korean pine is also a good tree species for afforestation in northeastern China.

The wood is versatile and very useful for construction. It is light, with straight grains, and easy to work. It is used for a great variety of products, including telephone poles, railroad ties, bridges, boats, plywood and flooring, furniture, sports equipment, and musical instruments. It is easy to break down into chips, particle board, or pulp for paper. The fatwood used to be the best kindling in the forest area of northeast China, and now it is a rare object. The carvings or prayer beads made of it are collected or used like precious ancient objects.

== Gallery ==
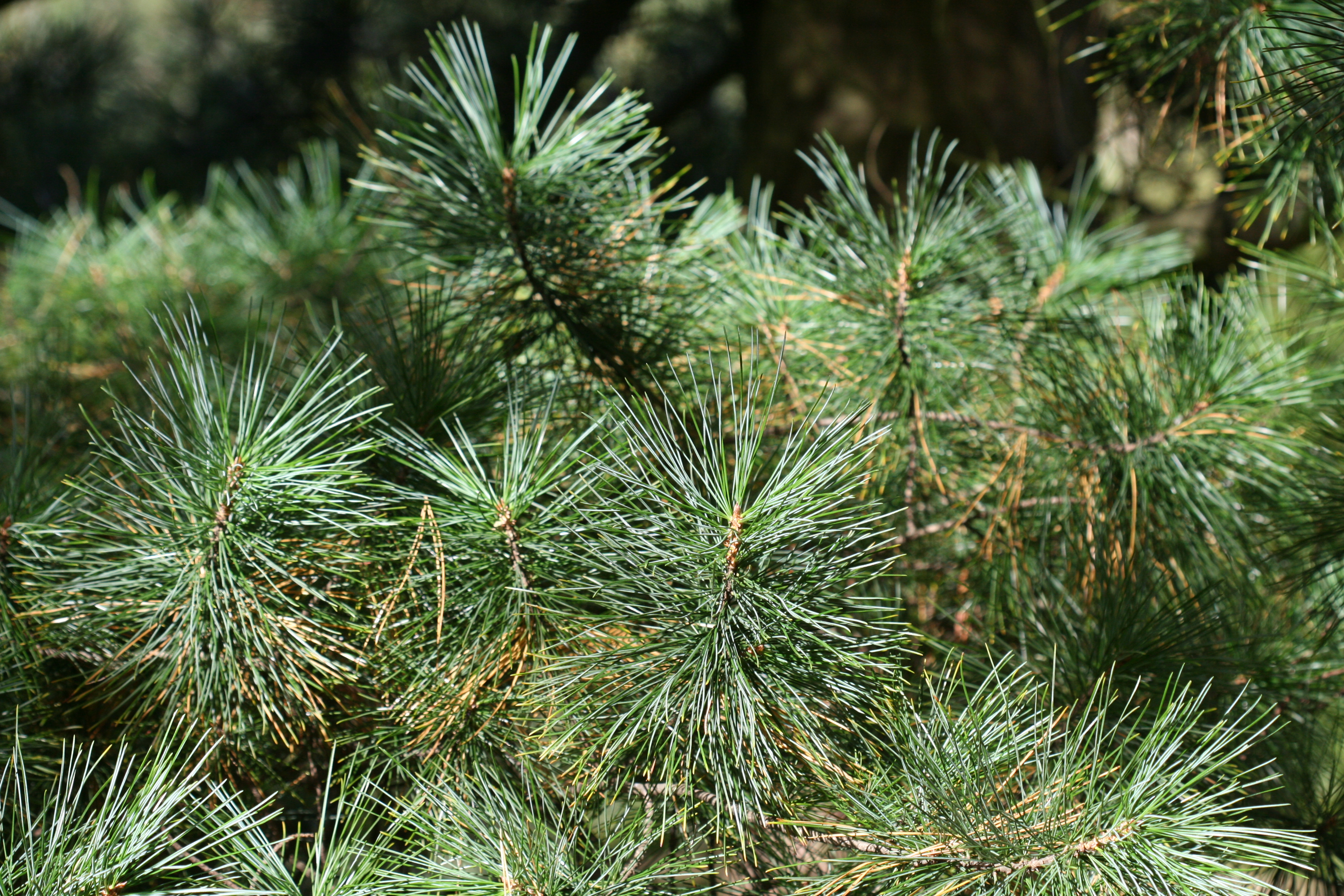
Leaves

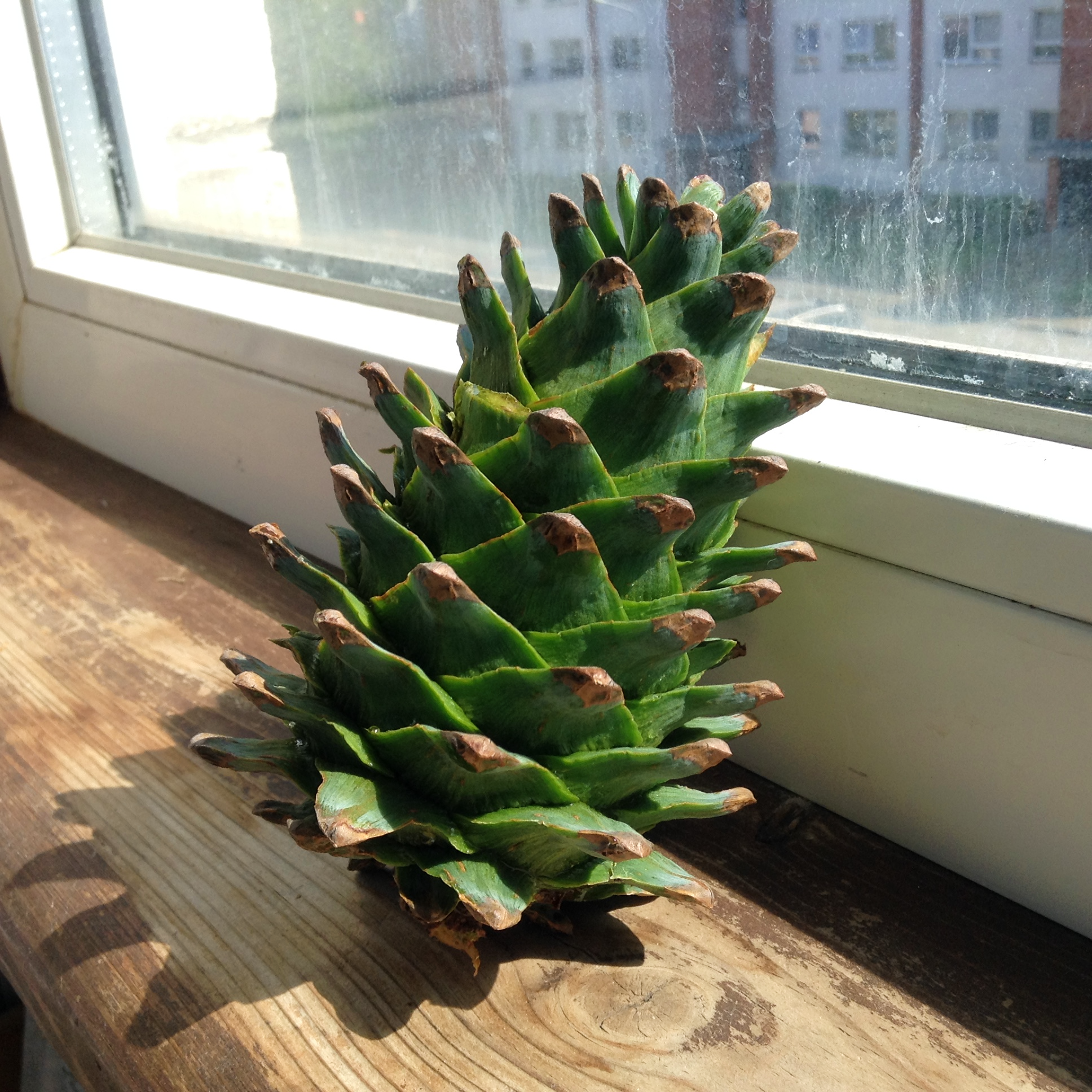
Immature Korean pine cone

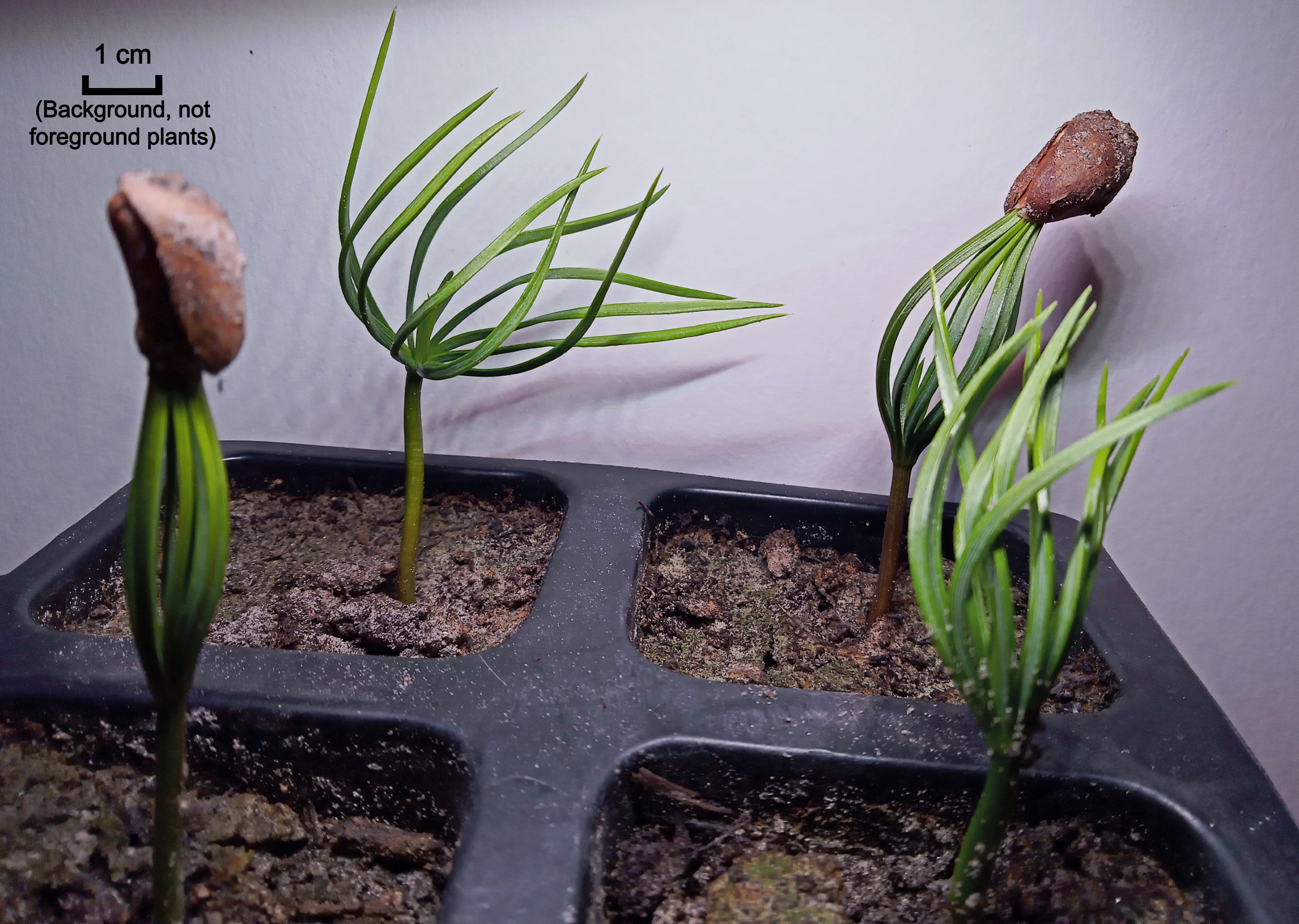
Seedlings

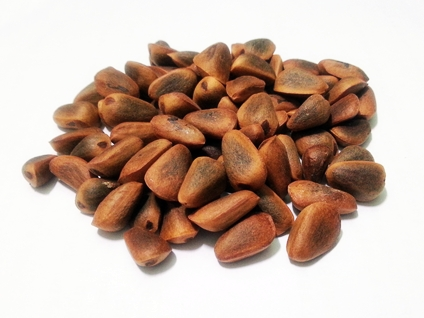
Seeds

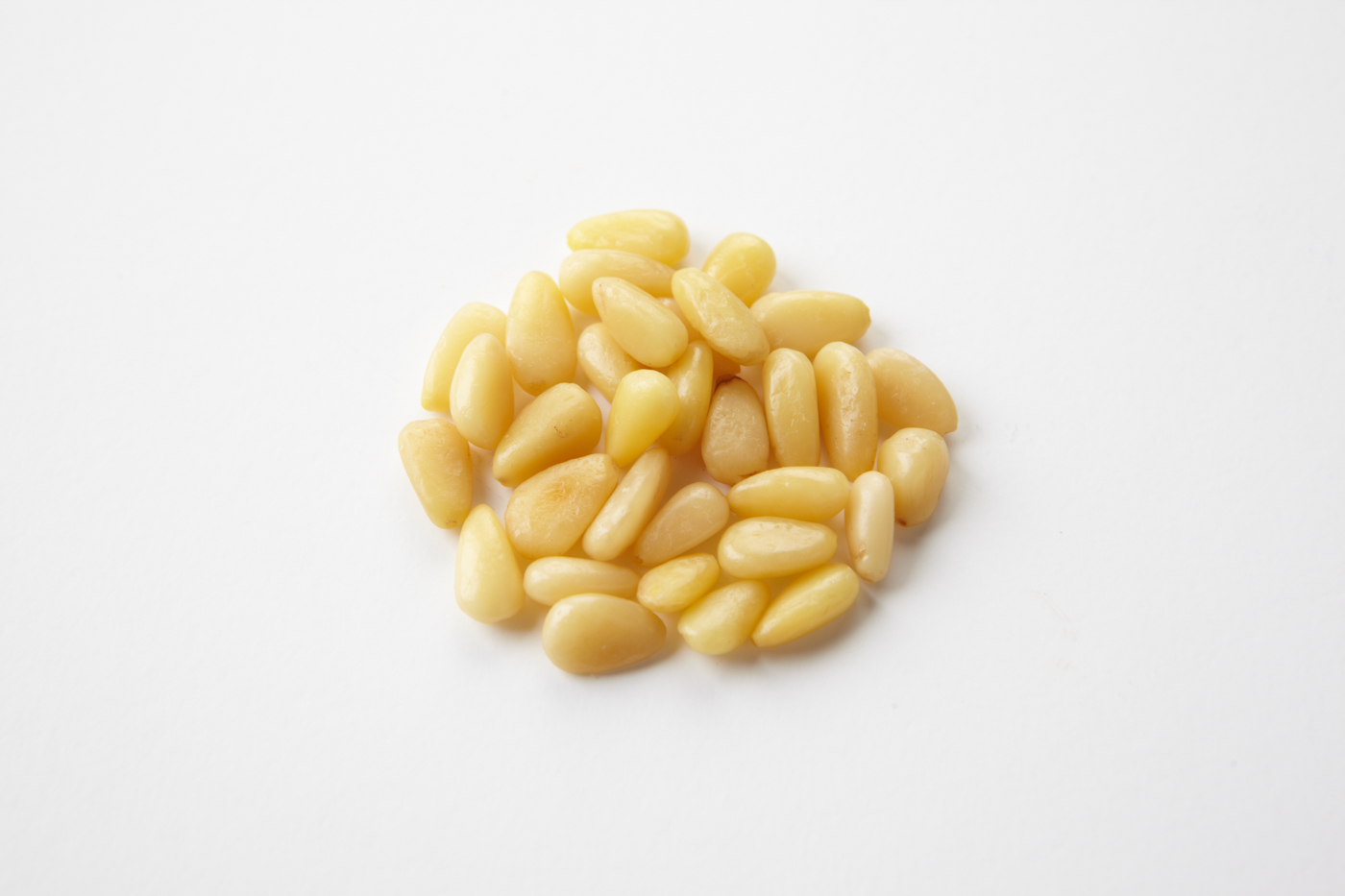
Pine nuts

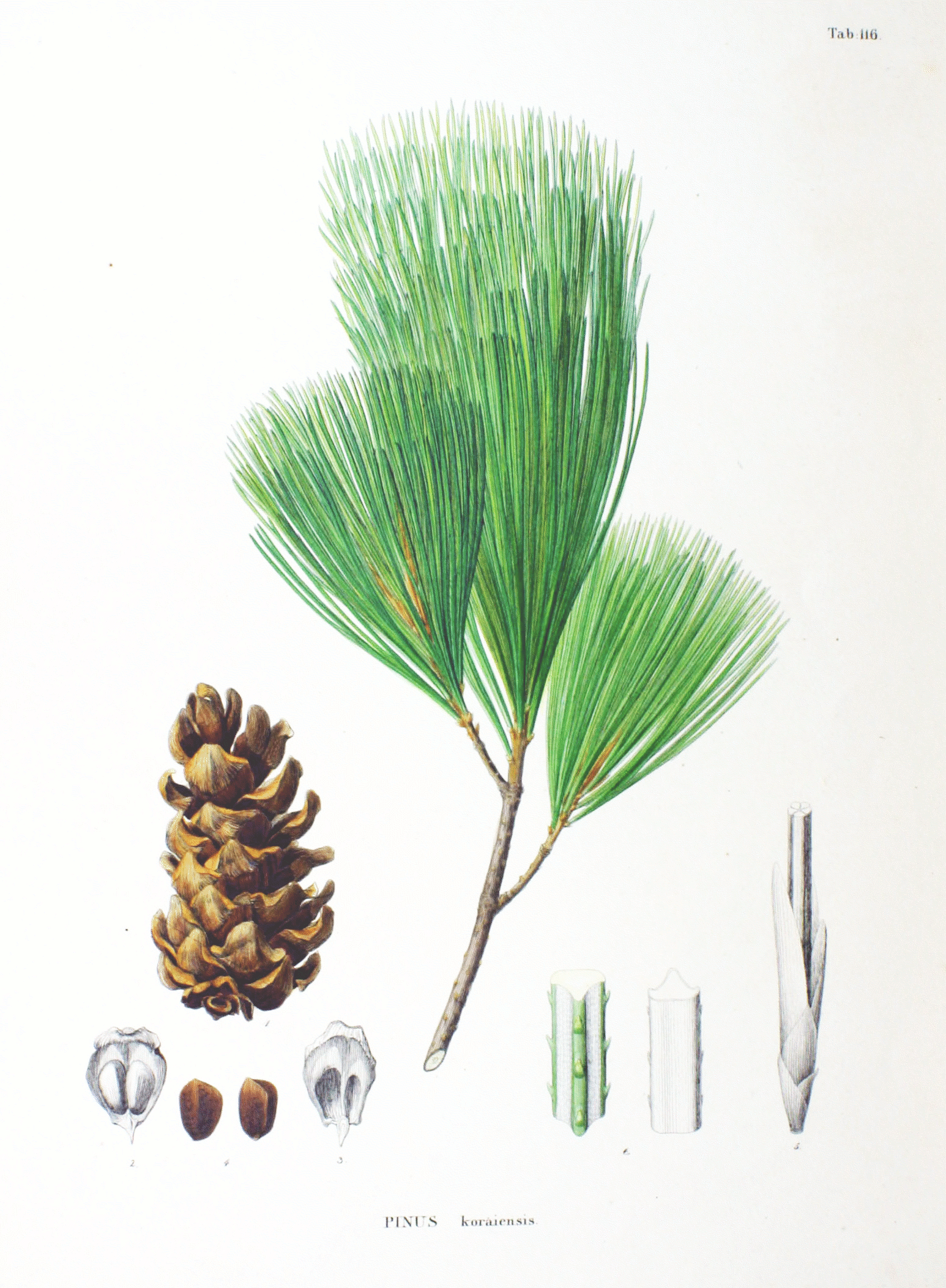
Illustration

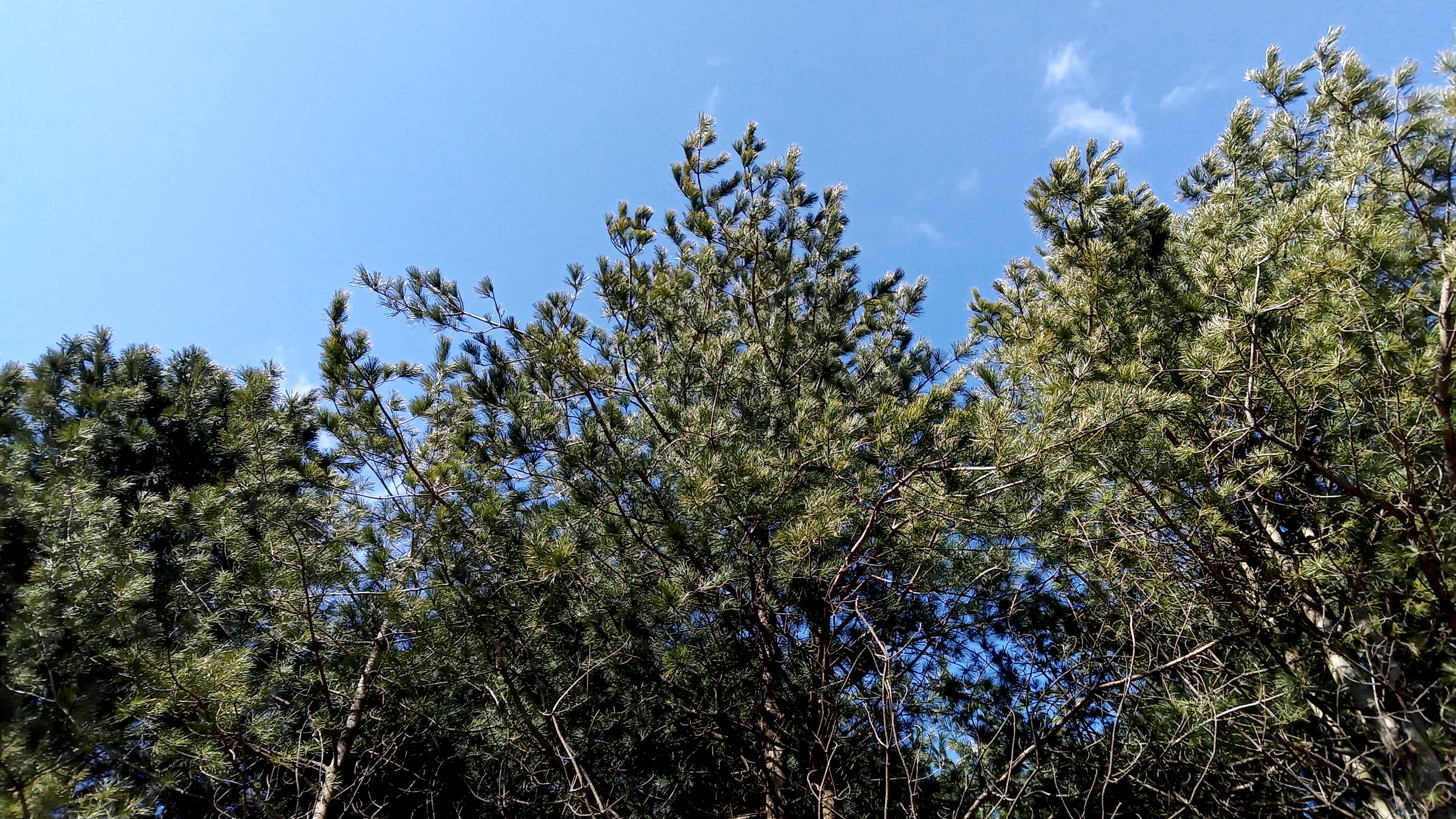
Canopy

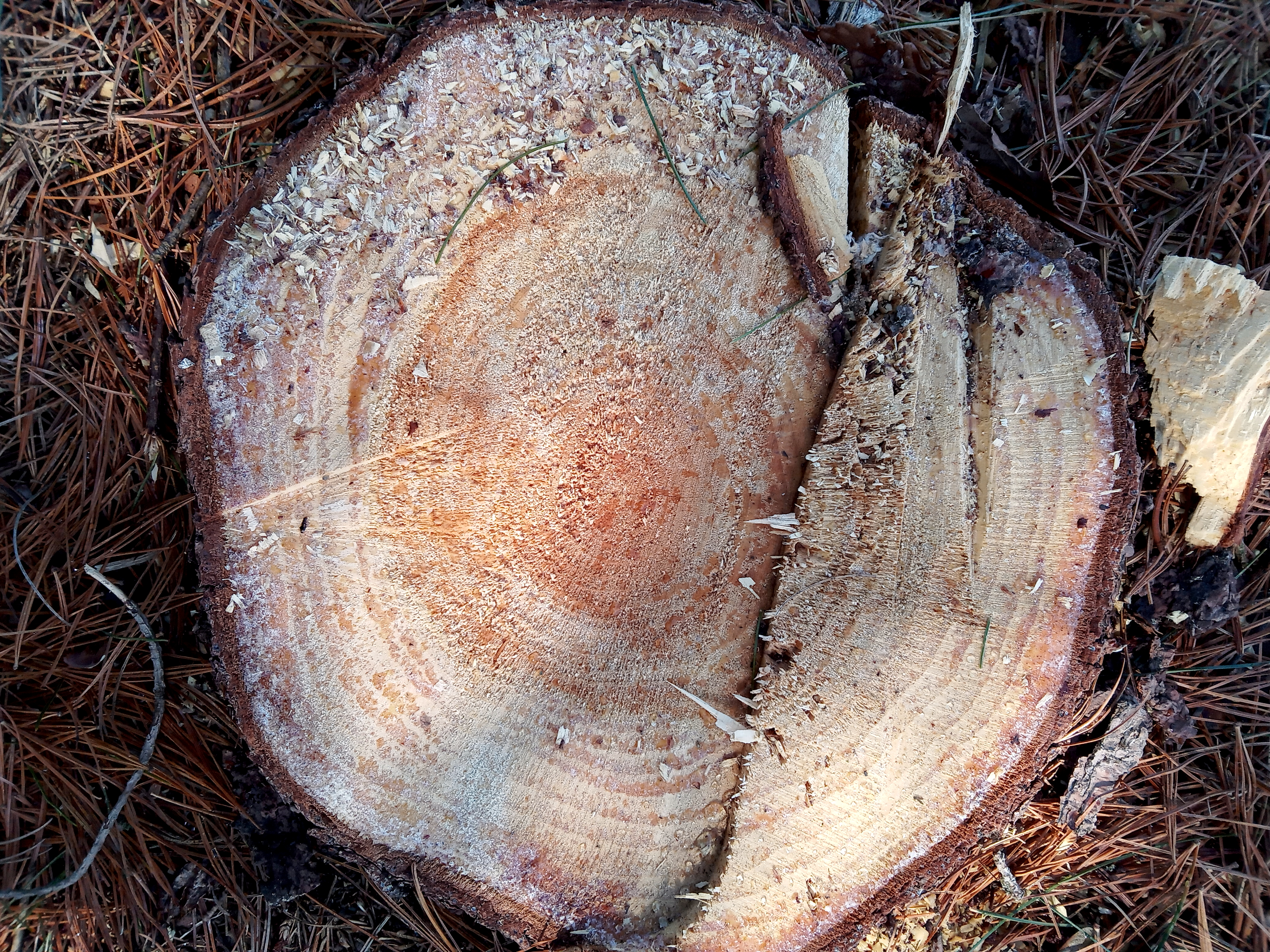
Trunk cross section

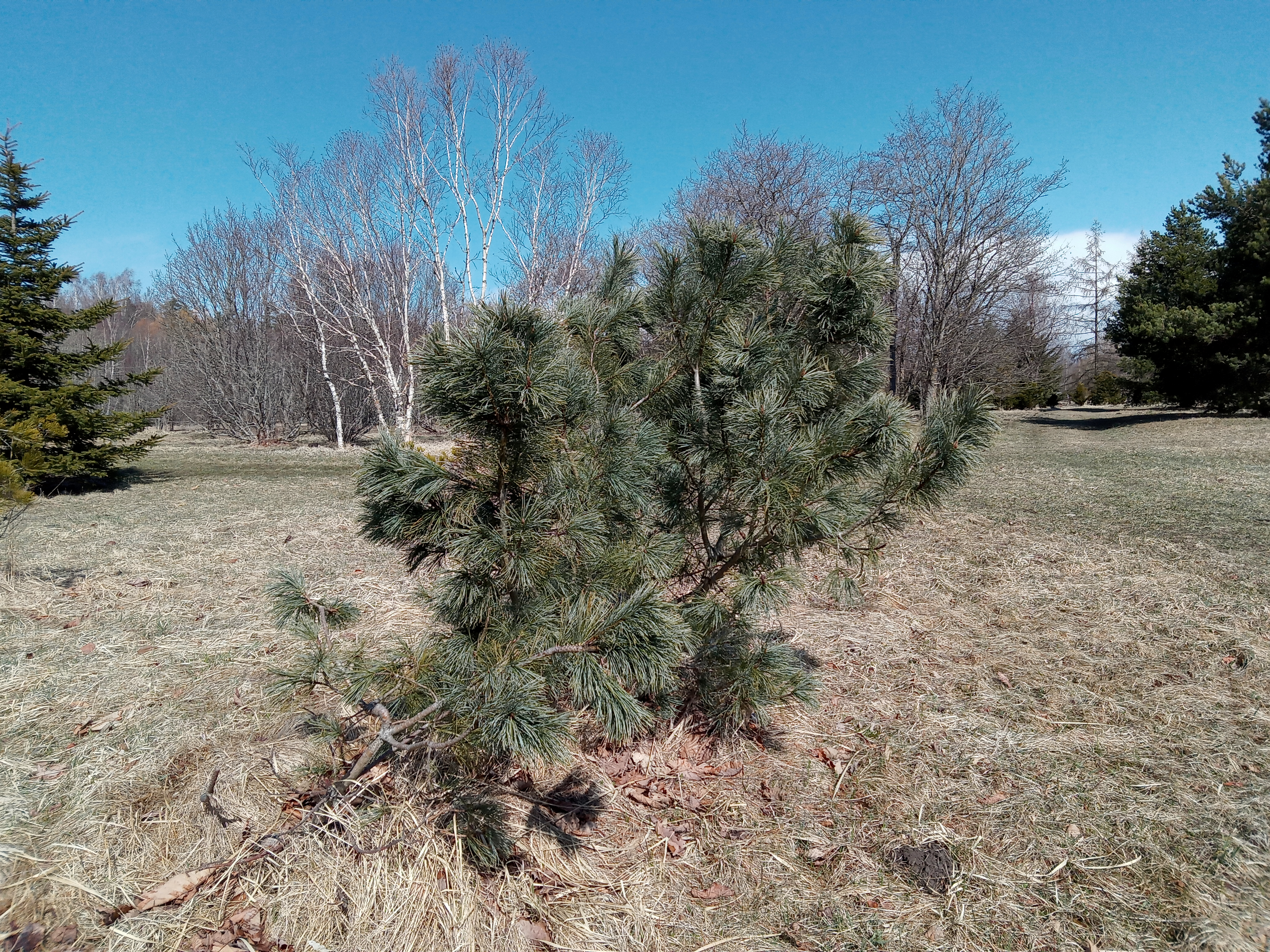
Young tree

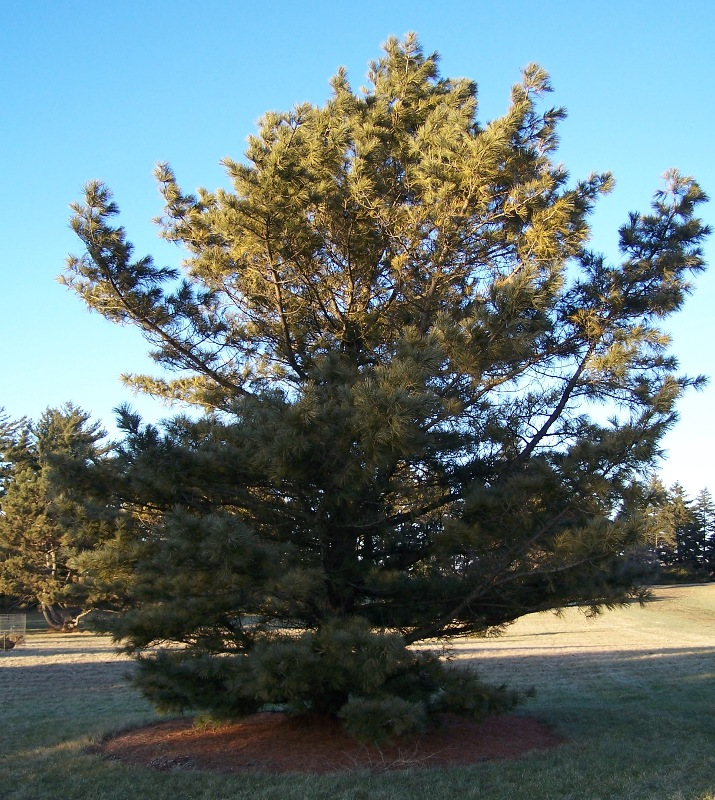
Cultivated at Morton Arboretum
