= Pine nut oil =

Vegetable oil from the seeds of pine species

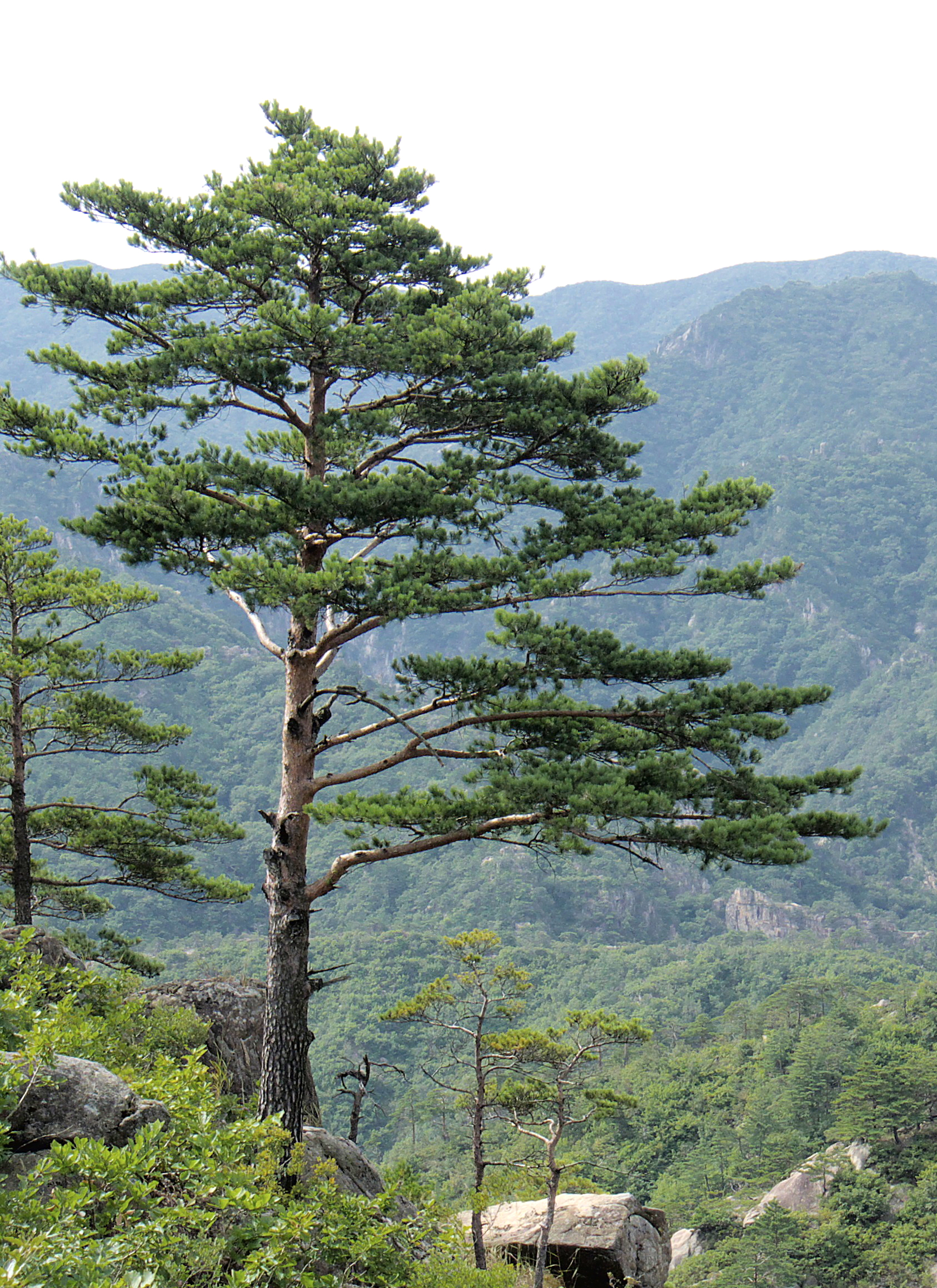
Coniferous trees produce nuts that can be pressed for oil.

Pine nut oil, also called pine seed oil or cedar nut oil, is a vegetable oil, extracted from the edible seeds of several species of pine. While the oil produced from the seeds of more common European and American pine varieties is mostly used for culinary purposes, Siberian pines (growing in Russia, Mongolia and Kazakhstan), as well as Korean pines (growing mostly in North Korea) yield the seeds with the highest content of pinolenic acid, as well as antioxidants associated with medicinal uses.

== Culinary uses ==
Pine nut oil has a relatively low smoke point, and is therefore not generally used during cooking. Rather, it is added to foods for "finishing", to add flavor. Pine nut oil is also a useful bread preservative when a small amount is added to the dough.

== Triglyceride composition ==
One analysis of the triglyceride composition of Siberian pine nut oil showed the following composition:

Fatty acid	Percentage
Linoleic acid	49.0% ± 2.3
Oleic acid	23.8% ± 2.1
Pinolenic acid	17.1% ± 2.0
Palmitic acid	6.3% ± 2.2
Stearic acid	2.5% ± 0.1

== See also ==
- Phytochemicals
