= Taxoleic acid =

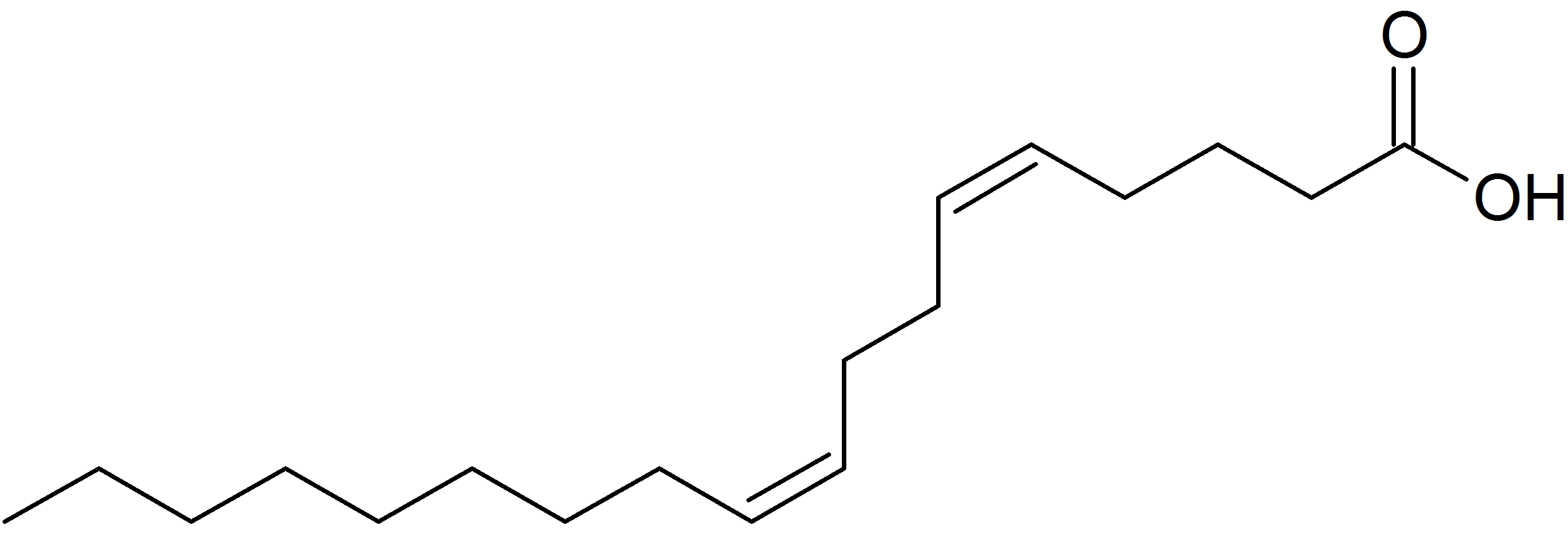

Names
- IUPAC name (5Z,9Z)-octadeca-5,9-dienoic acid

Identifiers
| 3D model (JSmol) | Interactive image |
| ChEBI | CHEBI:165493 |
| ChemSpider | 4471901 |
| PubChem CID | 5312476 |
- InChI: InChI=1S/C18H32O2/c1-2-3-4-5-6-7-8-9-10-11-12-13-14-15-16-17-18(19)20/h9-10,13-14H,2-8,11-12,15-17H2,1H3,(H,19,20)/b10-9-,14-13- Key: DFJAXEWDHVOILU-KWUOUXIESA-N
- SMILES: CCCCCCCC/C=C\CC/C=C\CCCC(=O)O

Properties
| Chemical formula | C_{18}H_{32}O_{2} |
| Molar mass | 280.452 g·mol^{−1} |
- Except where otherwise noted, data are given for materials in their standard state (at 25 °C [77 °F], 100 kPa). Infobox references

Taxoleic acid is a diunsaturated fatty acid composed of 18 carbon atoms with double bonds in the positions 5=6 and 9=10, both in cis-configuration. Taxoleic acid is isomeric to linoleic acid.

== Natural occurrence ==
The acid is present in the seed oils of conifers, such as Pinus nigra (≈47%), Taxus cuspidata (≈16.2%), Taxus baccata (≈12.2%), Cedrus libani (≈9.4%), Abies pinsapo (≈8.2%), Pinus pinaster (≈7.1%), Abies alba (≈6.2%), among others.

It is found in conifers, along with other fatty acids (juniperonic, pinolenic, coniferonic, sciadonic acid) that have a double bond in the position 5, separated by more than one methylene group from the next double bond.

== Biosynthesis ==
Taxoleic acid is believed to be biosynthesized from oleic acid by the enzyme Δ5-desaturase. A similar enzyme capable of producing taxolenic acid was also isolated from the oomycete Pythium irregulare.

The biosynthesis of taxolenic acid and similar fatty acids has also been studied in sponges, where the double bonds are introduced sequentially in a random order.
