= Atuna excelsa =

Scientific classification
- Kingdom: Plantae
- Clade: Tracheophytes
- Clade: Angiosperms
- Clade: Eudicots
- Clade: Rosids
- Order: Malpighiales
- Family: Chrysobalanaceae
- Genus: Atuna
- Species: A. excelsa

Binomial name
- Atuna excelsa (Jack) Kosterm.

Synonyms
- Of the species: Atuna racemosa subsp. excelsa (Jack) Prance, nom. superfl.; Cyclandrophora excelsa (Jack) Kosterm.; Ferolia jackiana (Benth.) Kuntze; Parinari jackiana Benth.; Petrocarya excelsa Jack; Of subsp. excelsa: Atuna villamilii (Merr.) Kosterm.; Cyclandrophora asperula (Miq.) Prance ex Kosterm.; Cyclandrophora villamilii (Merr.) Prance ex Kosterm.; Ferolia asperula (Miq.) Kuntze; Parinari asperula Miq.; Parinari maingayi King; Parinari spicata King; Parinari villamilii Merr.; Pasania litoralis (Blume) Oerst.; Quercus litoralis Blume; Of subsp. racemosa: Atuna elata (King) Kosterm.; Atuna racemosa Raf.; Atuna scabra (Hassk.) Kosterm.; Chrysobalanus racemosus Roxb.; Cyclandrophora elata (King) Kosterm.; Cyclandrophora glaberrima Hassk.; Cyclandrophora laurina (A.Gray) Kosterm.; Cyclandrophora scabra (Hassk.) Kosterm.; Ferolia glaberrima (Hassk.) Kuntze; Ferolia scabra (Hassk.) Kuntze; Parinari curranii Merr.; Parinari elata King; Parinari glaberrima (Hassk.) Hassk.; Parinari hahlii Warb.; Parinari lanceolata Teijsm. & Binn., nom. nud.; Parinari laurina A.Gray; Parinari macrophylla Teijsm. & Binn., nom. nud.; Parinari margarata A.Gray; Parinari mindanaensis Perkins; Parinari racemosa Merr., nom. illeg.; Parinari scabra var. lanceolata Koord. & Valeton; Parinari scabra var. macrophylla Koord. & Valeton; Parinari scabra Hassk.; Parinari warburgii Perkins ex Merr.; Petrocarya glaberrima (Hassk.) Miers; Petrocarya scabra (Hassk.) Miers

Species of plant

Atuna excelsa is a species of flowering plant in the family Chrysobalanaceae, native to Thailand to the western Pacific.

== Taxonomy ==
Atuna excelsa was first described by William Jack in 1822 as Petrocarya excelsa. The species and its two subspecies have acquired a large number of synonyms.

=== Subspecies ===
As of February 2023, Plants of the World Online accepted two subspecies:

- Atuna excelsa subsp. excelsa – Malesia and New Guinea
- Atuna excelsa subsp. racemosa (Raf.) Prance – throughout most of the distribution of the species; introduced to Java

== Distribution ==
Atuna excelsa is native to Thailand, Malesia (Borneo, Java, Peninsular Malaysia, the Maluku Islands, the Philippines, Sulawesi and Sumatra), Papuasia (the Bismarck Archipelago, New Guinea and the Solomon Islands) and the western Pacific (the Caroline Islands, Fiji, Samoa, the Santa Cruz Islands, Tonga, Vanuatu and Wallis and Futuna).
