= Atuna nannodes =

Conservation status
- Least Concern (IUCN 3.1)

Scientific classification
- Kingdom: Plantae
- Clade: Tracheophytes
- Clade: Angiosperms
- Clade: Eudicots
- Clade: Rosids
- Order: Malpighiales
- Family: Chrysobalanaceae
- Genus: Atuna
- Species: A. nannodes

Binomial name
- Atuna nannodes (Kosterm.) Kosterm.

Synonyms
- Cyclandrophora nannodes (Kosterm.) Kosterm. & Prance; Parinari nannodes Kosterm.

Species of tree

Atuna nannodes is a tree in the family Chrysobalanaceae. The specific epithet nannodes is from the Greek meaning 'dwarf', referring to the tree's small size.

== Description ==
Atuna nannodes grows up to 20 metres (70 ft) tall. The smooth bark is dark grey. The flowers are white. The ellipsoid fruits measure up to 4 cm (2 in) long.

== Distribution and habitat ==
Atuna nannodes is native to Peninsular Malaysia and Borneo. Its habitat is lowland and hill rain forests, on well-drained hillsides and ridges, from sea-level to 750 metres (2,500 ft) elevation.
