= Peter Cockburn =

Philatelist

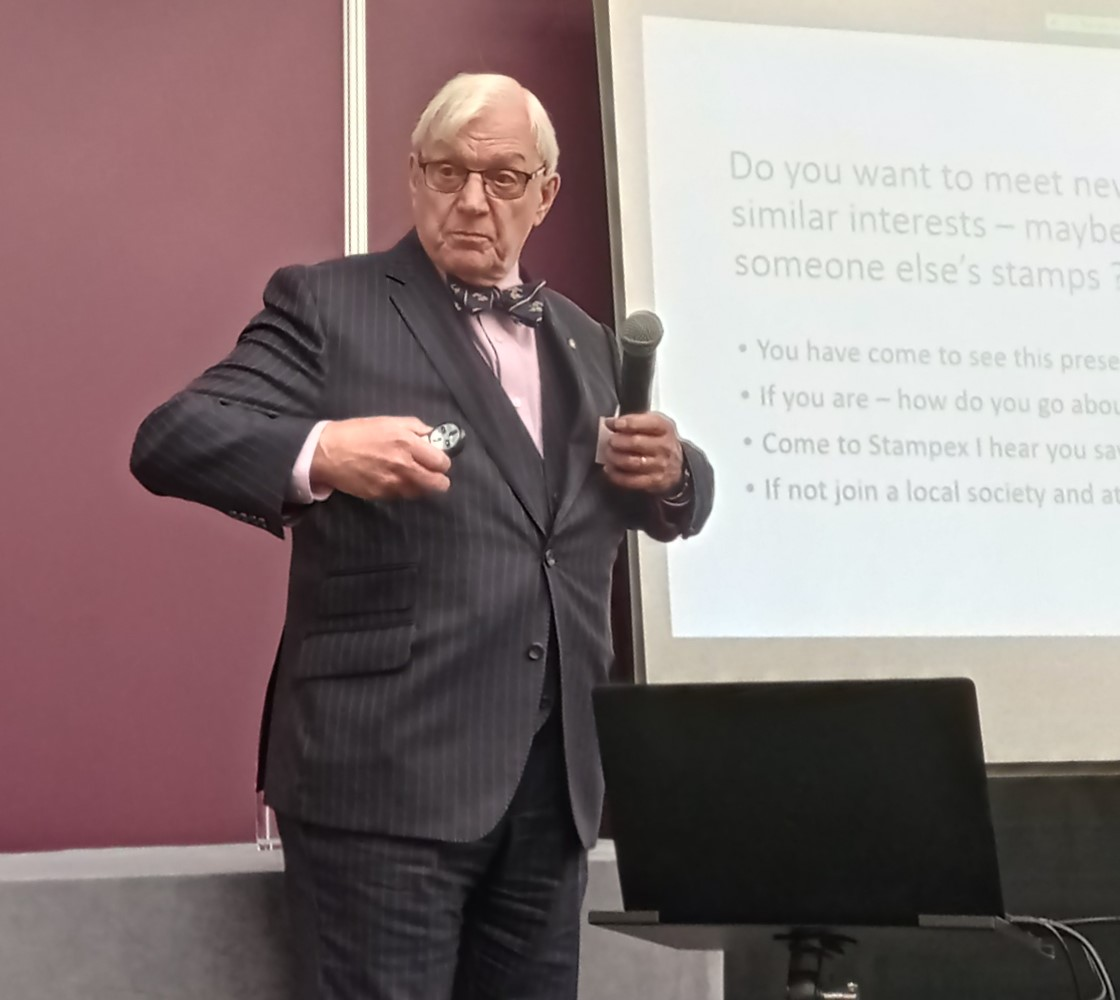
- Peter Cockburn presenting at Autumn Stampex 2021
- Born: January 1946 (age 79–80)
- Education: University College, Oxford

Peter Francis Cockburn FRPSL (born January 1946) is the president of the Royal Philatelic Society London. He is a leading revenue philatelist whose collection of stamps and covers of South East Asia was sold by Spink in Singapore in 2014. He also collects the postage stamps of the BMA period of Malaya.

He came up to University College, Oxford, to study for a degree in plant sciences in 1964.
