= Pinolenic acid =

18-Carbon polyunsaturated fatty acid

Names
- Preferred IUPAC name (5Z,9Z,12Z)-Octadeca-5,9,12-trienoic acid
- Other names Columbinic acid

Identifiers
CAS Number	16833-54-8
3D model (JSmol)	Interactive image
ChEBI	CHEBI:86136
ChemSpider	4471920
PubChem CID	5312493
UNII	B810C93MD7
CompTox Dashboard (EPA)	DTXSID00895852
- InChI: InChI=1S/C18H30O2/c1-2-3-4-5-6-7-8-9-10-11-12-13-14-15-16-17-18(19)20/h6-7,9-10,13-14H,2-5,8,11-12,15-17H2,1H3,(H,19,20)/b7-6-,10-9-,14-13- Key: HXQHFNIKBKZGRP-URPRIDOGSA-N; InChI=1/C18H30O2/c1-2-3-4-5-6-7-8-9-10-11-12-13-14-15-16-17-18(19)20/h6-7,9-10,13-14H,2-5,8,11-12,15-17H2,1H3,(H,19,20)/b7-6-,10-9-,14-13- Key: HXQHFNIKBKZGRP-URPRIDOGBF
- SMILES: CCCCC/C=C\C/C=C\CC/C=C\CCCC(=O)O

Properties
Chemical formula	C_{18}H_{30}O_{2}
Molar mass	278.4296 g/mol
- Except where otherwise noted, data are given for materials in their standard state (at 25 °C [77 °F], 100 kPa). verify (what is ?) Infobox references

Pinolenic acid (often misspelled as pinoleic acid) is a fatty acid contained in Siberian Pine nuts, Korean Pine nuts and the seeds and xylem of other pine (Pinus) species. The highest percentage of pinolenic acid is found in Siberian pine nuts and the oil produced from them.

== Chemistry and biochemistry ==
Pinolenic acid is formally designated as all-cis-5,9,12-18:3. Some sources also use the term columbinic acid for this substance. But columbinic acid sometimes designates an E-Z isomer (trans,cis,cis delta-5,9,12/18:3) in the biologic literature.

Pinolenic acid is an isomer of gamma-linolenic acid (GLA). GLA is an ω-6 essential fatty acid (EFA) but pinolenic acid is not. However, like the EFAs, it forms biologically active metabolites in the presence of cyclooxygenase or lipoxygenase. These metabolites can partially relieve some of the symptoms of EFA deficiency.

== Physiology ==
Recent research has shown its potential use in weight loss by curbing appetite. Pinolenic acid causes the triggering of two hunger suppressants—cholecystokinin and glucagon-like peptide-1 (GLP-1). Pinolenic acid may have LDL-lowering properties by enhancing hepatic LDL uptake.

== Natural occurrence ==
Oftentimes, it is found in conifers together with other fatty acids (juniperonic, coniferonic, taxoleic, sciadonic acid) that have a double bond in the position 5, separated by more than one methylene group from the next double bond.
