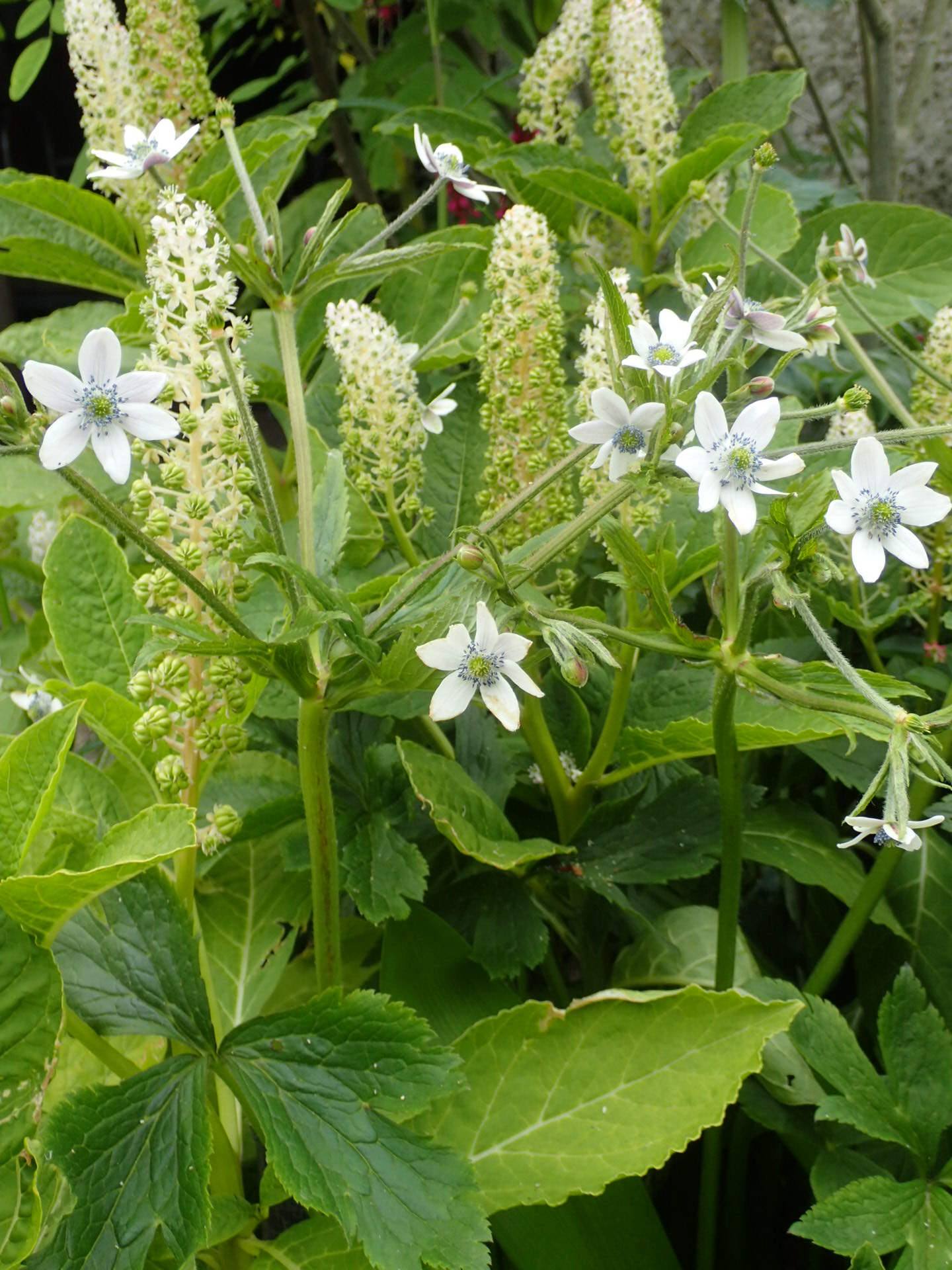
- Anemone leveillei (six petalled flowers) together with Phytolacca acinosa (flower spikes).

Scientific classification
- Kingdom: Plantae
- Clade: Tracheophytes
- Clade: Angiosperms
- Clade: Eudicots
- Order: Ranunculales
- Family: Ranunculaceae
- Genus: Anemone
- Species: A. leveillei

Binomial name
- Anemone leveillei Ulbr.

= Anemone leveillei =

Species of flowering plant

Anemone leveillei, or woodland windflower, is a species of flowering plant in the family Ranunculaceae, native to central China. It was described and published by Oskar Eberhard Ulbrich in 1905.
