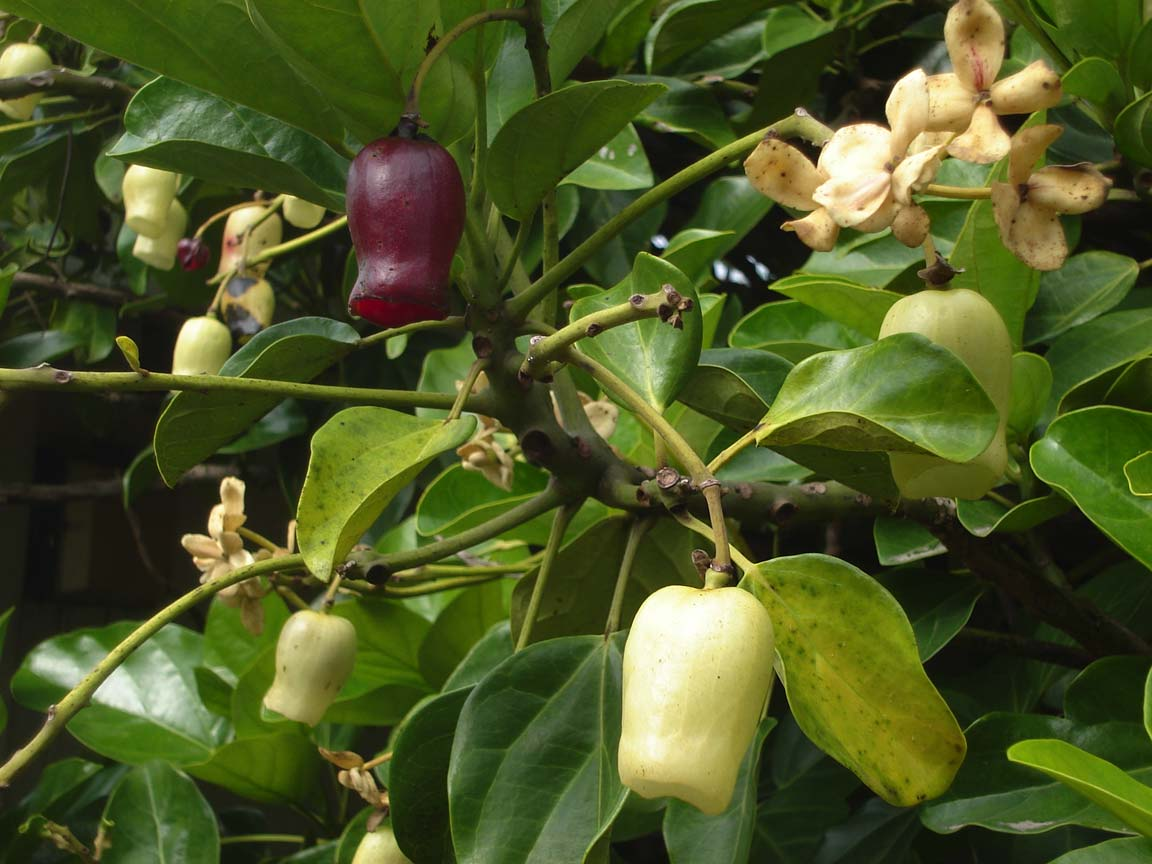
- Makita tree (Atuna excelsa subsp. racemosa)

Scientific classification
- Kingdom: Plantae
- Clade: Tracheophytes
- Clade: Angiosperms
- Clade: Eudicots
- Clade: Rosids
- Order: Malpighiales
- Family: Chrysobalanaceae
- Genus: Atuna; Raf., 1838

Type species
- Atuna racemosa ≡ Atuna excelsa subsp. racemosa Raf.

Synonyms
- Cyclandrophora Hassk.≡; Entosiphon Bedd.

= Atuna (plant) =

Genus of plants

Atuna is a genus of plants in the family Chrysobalanaceae described as a genus in 1838. It is native to the Indian subcontinent, Southeast Asia, and various islands of the western Pacific.

== Species ==
As of February 2023, Plants of the World Online accepted the following species:

- Atuna cordata Cockburn ex Prance - Sabah
- Atuna elliptica (Kosterm.) Kosterm. - Fiji
- Atuna excelsa (Jack) Kosterm. – Thailand to the western Pacific
- Atuna indica (Bedd.) Kosterm. - Kerala, Tamil Nadu
- Atuna latifrons (Kosterm.) Prance & F.White - Perak
- Atuna nannodes (Kosterm.) Kosterm. - Peninsular Malaysia, Borneo
- Atuna penangiana (Kosterm.) Kosterm. - Peninsular Malaysia
- Atuna travancorica (Bedd.) Kosterm. - Kerala
