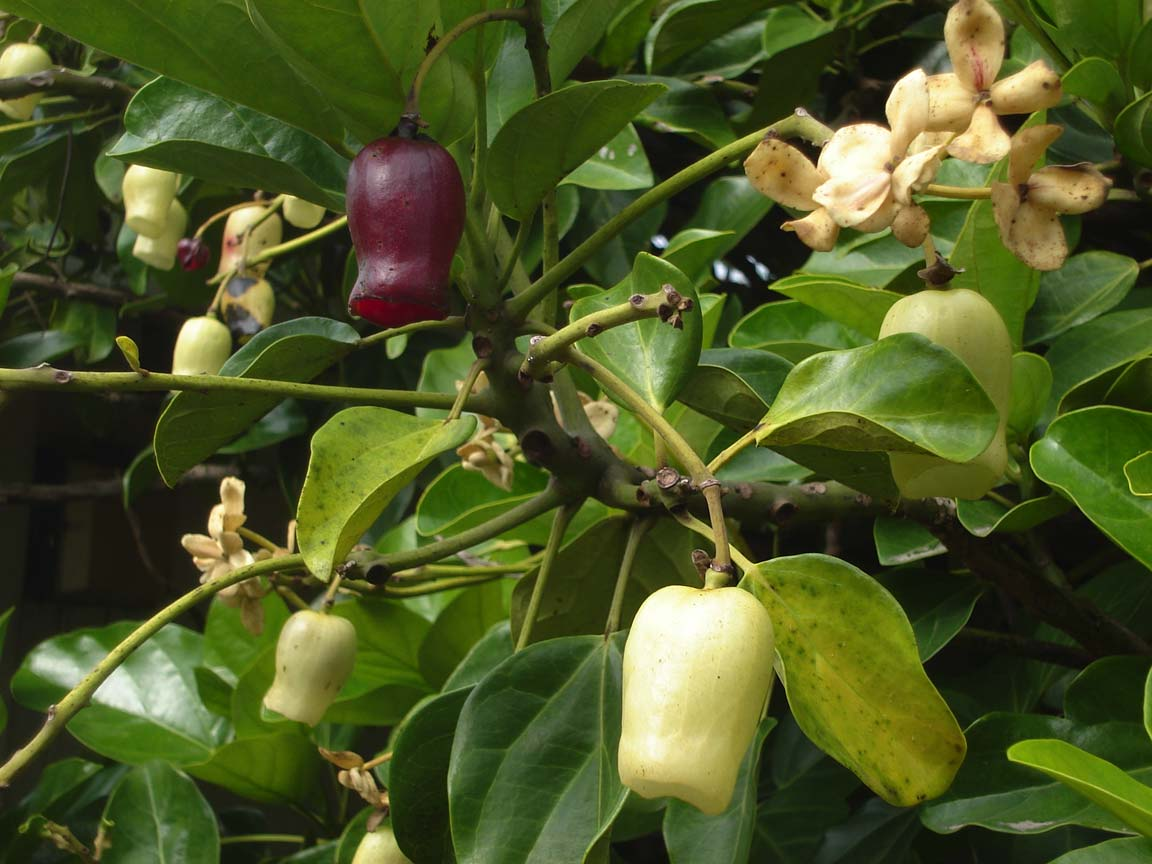
- Flowers and leaves from Tonga, where it is known as the pipi tree
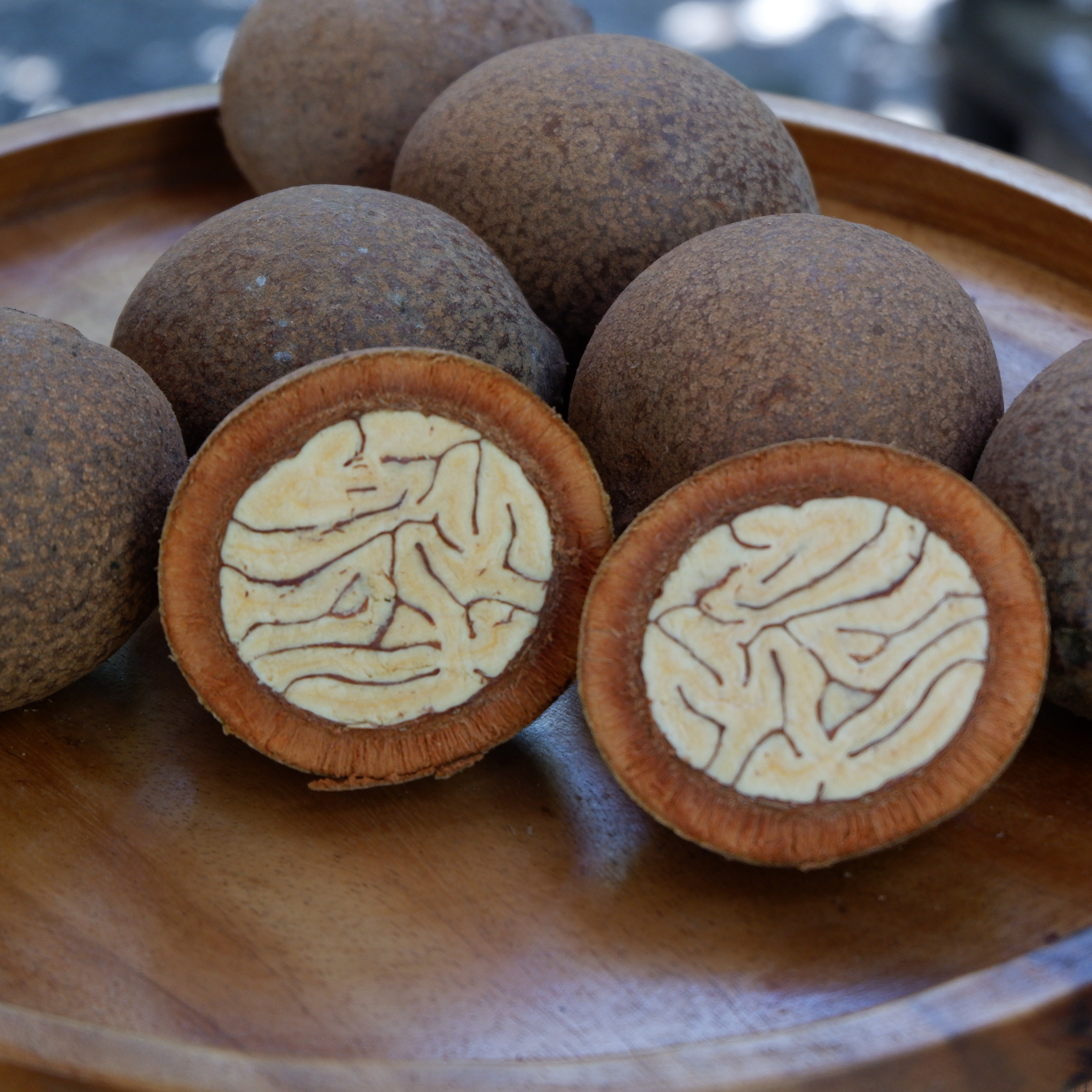
- Fruits in the Philippines where it is known as tabon-tabon and used in the preparation of the dish kinilaw

Conservation status
- Least Concern (IUCN 3.1)

Scientific classification
- Kingdom: Plantae
- Clade: Tracheophytes
- Clade: Angiosperms
- Clade: Eudicots
- Clade: Rosids
- Order: Malpighiales
- Family: Chrysobalanaceae
- Genus: Atuna
- Species: A. excelsa
- Subspecies: A. e. subsp. racemosa

Trinomial name
- Atuna excelsa subsp. racemosa (Raf.) Prance

Synonyms
- List: Atuna elata (King) Kosterm.; Atuna racemosa Raf.; Atuna scabra (Hassk.) Kosterm.; Chrysobalanus racemosus Roxb.; Cyclandrophora elata (King) Kosterm.; Cyclandrophora glaberrima Hassk.; Cyclandrophora laurina (A.Gray) Kosterm.; Cyclandrophora scabra (Hassk.) Kosterm.; Ferolia glaberrima (Hassk.) Kuntze; Ferolia scabra (Hassk.) Kuntze; Parinari curranii Merr.; Parinari elata King; Parinari glaberrima (Hassk.) Hassk.; Parinari hahlii Warb.; Parinari lanceolata Teijsm. & Binn., nom. nud.; Parinari laurina A.Gray; Parinari macrophylla Teijsm. & Binn., nom. nud.; Parinari margarata A.Gray; Parinari mindanaensis Perkins; Parinari racemosa Merr., nom. illeg.; Parinari scabra Hassk.; Parinari scabra var. lanceolata Koord. & Valeton; Parinari scabra var. macrophylla Koord. & Valeton; Parinari warburgii Perkins ex Merr.; Petrocarya glaberrima (Hassk.) Miers; Petrocarya scabra (Hassk.) Miers

= Atuna excelsa subsp. racemosa =

Species of tree

Atuna excelsa subsp. racemosa, synonym Atuna racemosa, is a tree in the family Chrysobalanaceae. The epithet racemosa is from the Latin meaning 'clustered', referring to the inflorescence. The tree is widely known as tabon-tabon in the Philippines, where the fruits have been traditionally used for the preparation of kinilaw (a local dish of raw fish in vinegar or citrus juices) for almost a thousand years.

== Description ==
Atuna excelsa subsp. racemosa grows up to 35 metres (110 ft) tall. The smooth bark is grey to black. The flowers are blue or white. The fruits are ellipsoid, roundish or pear-shaped and measure up to 7.5 cm (3 in) long.

== Distribution and habitat ==
Atuna excelsa subsp. racemosa is found widely in Thailand, Malesia and the South Pacific islands of Oceania. Its habitat is mixed dipterocarp forests, also in swamps and along rivers, from sea level to 750 metres (2,500 ft) elevation.

== Uses ==
The fruit is made into a putty for sealing canoes in the Pacific islands. Oil from the seeds is used as a scent. Leaves are used as thatch in Fiji.

In the Philippines, where the tree is known as tabon-tabon, juice from the grated flesh of the fruits is used to neutralize the fishy taste and the acidity of the raw seafood dish kinilaw. The remains of halved tabon-tabon fruits alongside cut fish bones have been recovered from the Balangay archeological excavation site in Butuan (dated c. 10th to 13th century AD) indicating that this cooking practice is almost a thousand years old.
