= Juniperonic acid =

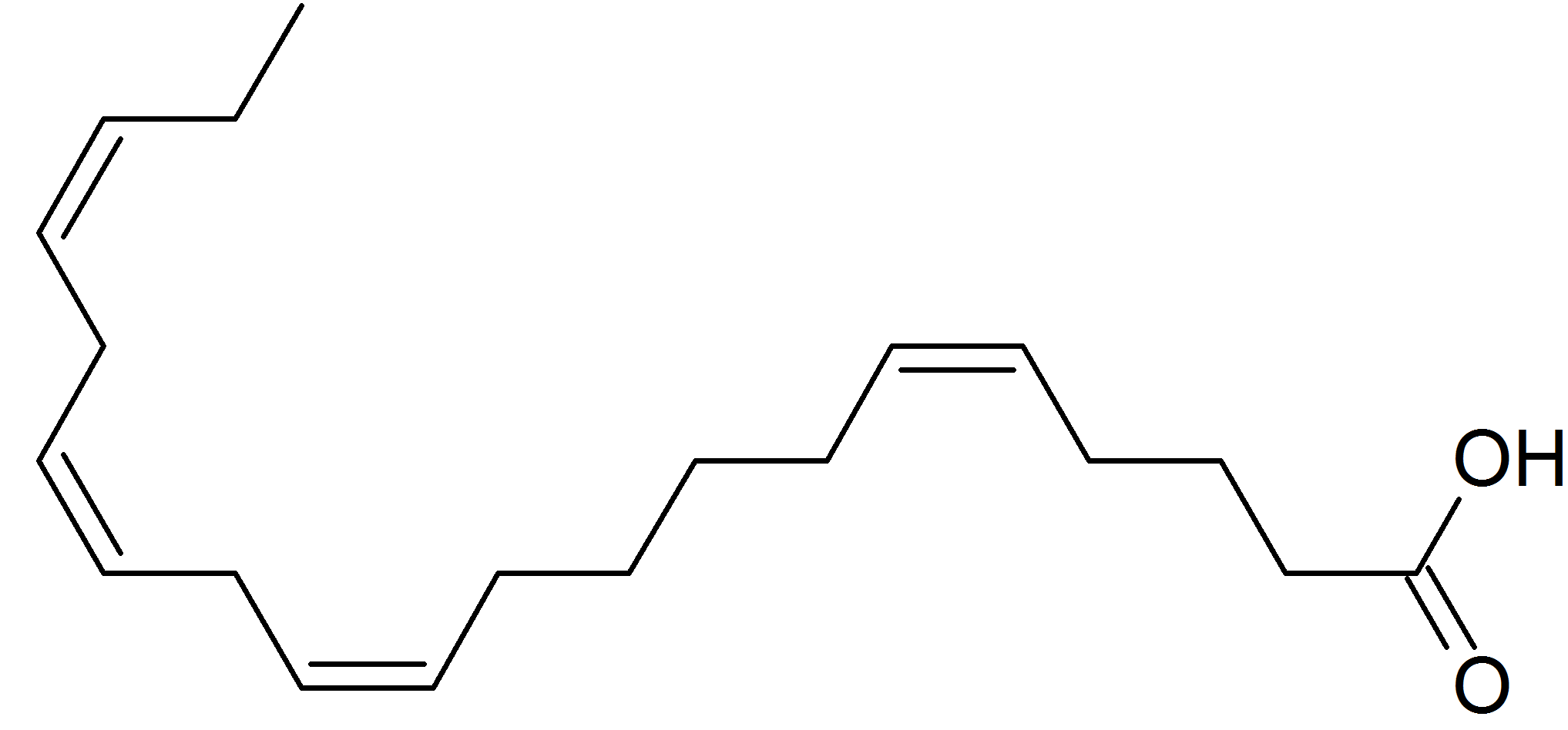

Names
- IUPAC name (5Z,11Z,14Z,17Z)-icosa-5,11,14,17-tetraenoic acid

Identifiers
3D model (JSmol)	Interactive image
ChEBI	CHEBI:82835
ChemSpider	4471968
PubChem CID	5312543
- InChI: InChI=1S/C20H32O2/c1-2-3-4-5-6-7-8-9-10-11-12-13-14-15-16-17-18-19-20(21)22/h3-4,6-7,9-10,15-16H,2,5,8,11-14,17-19H2,1H3,(H,21,22)/b4-3-,7-6-,10-9-,16-15- Key: JDKIKEYFSJUYJZ-OUJQXAOTSA-N
- SMILES: CC/C=C\C/C=C\C/C=C\CCCC/C=C\CCCC(=O)O

Properties
Chemical formula	C_{20}H_{32}O_{2}
Molar mass	304.474 g·mol^{−1}
- Except where otherwise noted, data are given for materials in their standard state (at 25 °C [77 °F], 100 kPa). Infobox references

Juniperonic acid is a polyunsaturated fatty acid featuring a 20-carbon chain with four cis-configured double bonds at positions 5, 11, 14, and 17. These structural traits categorize the compound as an omega-3 fatty acid, and it has drawn significant scientific attention due to its influence on regulating lipid membrane function and cell signaling processes.

It is an isomer of eicosatetraenoic acid like the better known omega-6 fatty acid, arachidonic acid.

== History and natural occurrence ==
The acid was isolated for the first time in 1963 on the leaves and fruits of Ginkgo biloba by JL Gellerman and H. Schlenk. It was then identified in the oils of other plants, especially conifers: Taxodium distichum (14.25%), Cupressus funebris (10.27%), Platycladus orientalis (9%), Taxus cuspidata (6.8%), etc.; in other flowering plants: Ephedra gerardiana (19.2%), Caltha sp. (9.4%), Ephedra nevadensis (9.3%), and Ephedra przewalskii (8.8%), among others; and in some marine animals.

The acid was later discovered in the seed oil of Juniperus communis (18%), which is why the acid is called juniperonic. It was first synthesized in 2010 by A. Vik and co-workers.

Oftentimes, it is found in conifers together with other fatty acids (taxoleic, pinolenic, taxoleic, sciadonic acid) that have a double bond in the position 5, separated by more than one methylene group from the next double bond.

== Uses ==
Thuja seeds are used in traditional Chinese medicine. This acid exhibits interesting biological activity and becomes α-linolenic acid in animal models.
