= Α-Parinaric acid =

α-Parinaric acid

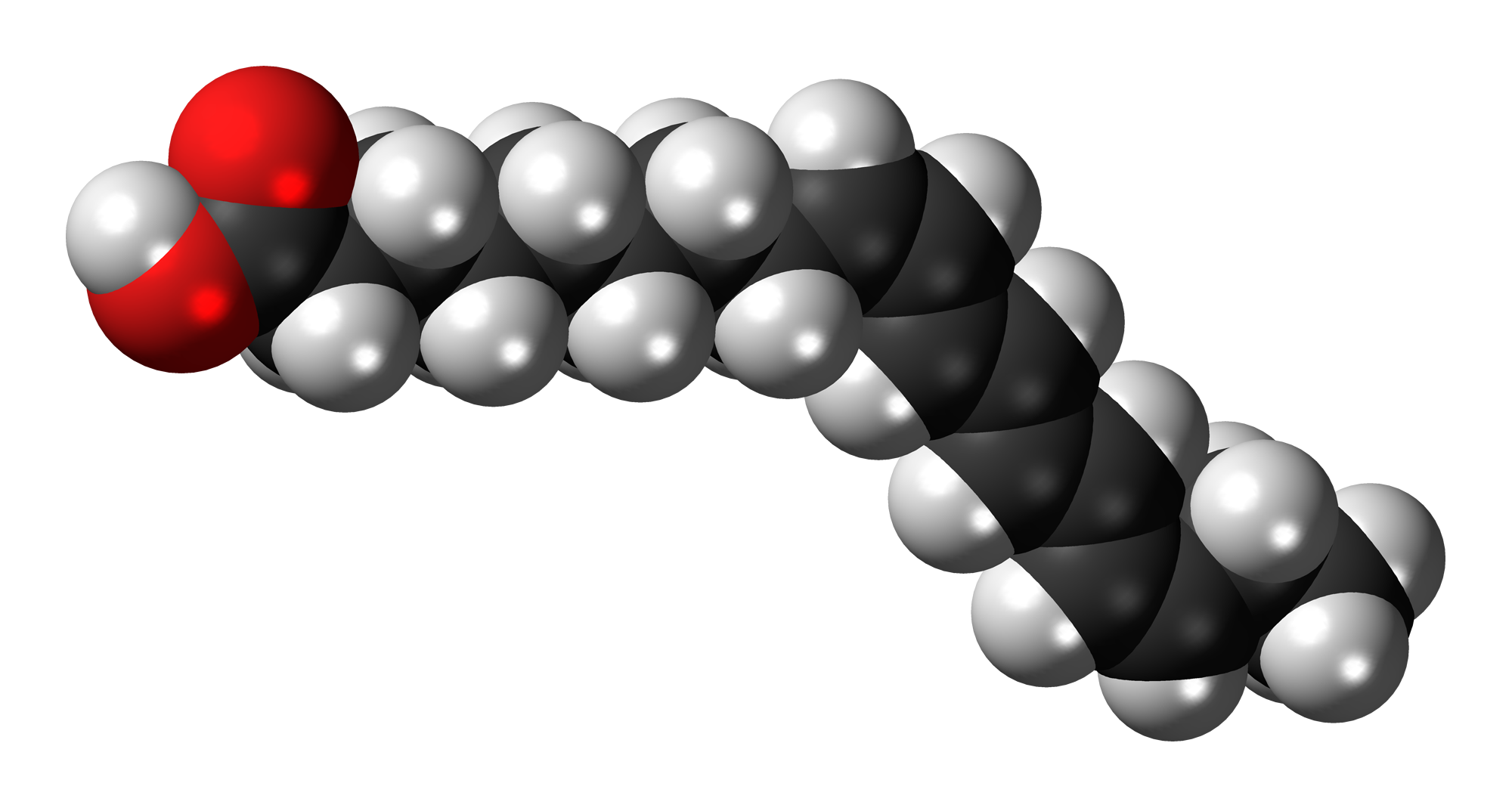

Names
- Preferred IUPAC name (9Z,11E,13E,15Z)-Octadeca-9,11,13,15-tetraenoic acid
- Other names cis-parinaric acid α-parinaric acid

Identifiers
CAS Number	593-38-4
3D model (JSmol)	Interactive image
ChEBI	CHEBI:32409
ChemSpider	4574382
PubChem CID	5460995
UNII	PK8M3ENX8C
CompTox Dashboard (EPA)	DTXSID501027236
- InChI: InChI=1S/C18H28O2/c1-2-3-4-5-6-7-8-9-10-11-12-13-14-15-16-17-18(19)20/h3-10H,2,11-17H2,1H3,(H,19,20)/b4-3-,6-5+,8-7+,10-9- Key: IJTNSXPMYKJZPR-ZSCYQOFPSA-N; InChI=1/C18H28O2/c1-2-3-4-5-6-7-8-9-10-11-12-13-14-15-16-17-18(19)20/h3-10H,2,11-17H2,1H3,(H,19,20)/b4-3-,6-5+,8-7+,10-9- Key: IJTNSXPMYKJZPR-ZSCYQOFPBE
- SMILES: O=C(O)CCCCCCC/C=C\C=C\C=C\C=C/CC

Properties
Chemical formula	C_{18}H_{28}O_{2}
Molar mass	276.41372
Melting point	85 to 86 °C (185 to 187 °F; 358 to 359 K)
- Except where otherwise noted, data are given for materials in their standard state (at 25 °C [77 °F], 100 kPa). verify (what is ?) Infobox references

α-Parinaric acid is a conjugated polyunsaturated fatty acid. Discovered by Tsujimoto and Koyanagi in 1933, it contains 18 carbon atoms and 4 conjugated double bonds. The repeating single bond-double bond structure of α-parinaric acid distinguishes it structurally and chemically from the usual "methylene-interrupted" arrangement of polyunsaturated fatty acids that have double-bonds and single bonds separated by a methylene unit (−CH_{2}−). Because of the fluorescent properties conferred by the alternating double bonds, α-parinaric acid is commonly used as a molecular probe in the study of biomembranes.

== Natural sources ==
α-Parinaric acid occurs naturally in the seeds of the makita tree (Parinari laurina), a tree found in Fiji and other Pacific islands. Makita seeds contain about 46% α-parinaric acid, 34% α-eleostearic acid as major components, with lesser amounts of saturated fatty acids, oleic acid and linoleic acid. α-Parinaric acid is also found in the seed oil of Impatiens balsamina, a member of the family Balsaminaceae. The major fatty acids of Impatiens balsamina are 4.7% palmitic acid, 5.8% stearic acid, 2.8% arachidic acid, 18.3% oleic acid, 9.2% linoleic acid, 30.1% linolenic acid and 29.1% α-parinaric acid. It is also present in the fungus Clavulina cristata, and the plant Sebastiana brasiliensis (family Euphorbiaceae).

== Synthesis ==
=== Biosynthesis ===
The biochemical mechanism by which α-parinaric acid is formed in the plant Impatiens balsamina was elaborated using techniques of molecular biology. The enzyme responsible for the creation of the conjugated double bonds was identified using expressed sequence tags, and called a "conjugase". This enzyme is related to the family of fatty acid desaturase enzymes responsible for putting double bonds into fatty acids.

=== Chemical synthesis ===
α-Parinaric acid may be synthesized chemically using α-linolenic acid as a starting compound. This synthesis enables the transformation of 1,4,7-octatriene methylene-interrupted cis double bonds of naturally occurring polyunsaturated fatty acids to 1,3,5,7-octatetraenes in high yield. More recently (2008), Lee et al. reported a simple and efficient chemical synthesis using a modular design method called iterative cross-coupling.

== Uses ==
=== Membrane probes ===
Both the alpha and beta (all trans) isomers of parinaric acid are used as molecular probes of lipid-lipid interactions, by monitoring phase transitions in bilayer lipid membranes. α-Parinaric acid was shown to integrate normally into the phospholipid bilayer of mammalian cells, nervous tissue, with minimal effects on the biophysical properties of the membrane. Molecular interactions with neighboring membrane lipids will affect the fluorescence of α-parinaric acid in predictable ways, and the subsequent subtle changes in energy intensities may be measured spectroscopically.

Researchers have put α-parinaric to good use in the study of membrane biophysics. For example, it was used to help establish the existence of a "fluidity gradient" across the membrane bilayer of some tumor cells ― the inner monolayer of the membrane is less fluid than the outer monolayer.

=== Lipid-protein interactions ===
α-Parinaric acid is also used as a chromophore to study interactions between membrane proteins and lipids. Because of the similarity of α-parinaric acid to normal membrane lipids, it has minimal perturbing influence. By measuring shifts in the absorption spectrum, enhancement of α-parinaric acid fluorescence, induced circular dichroism, and energy transfer between tryptophan amino acids in the protein and the bound chromophore, information may be gleaned about the molecular interactions between protein and lipid. For example, this technique is used to investigate how fatty acids bind to serum albumin (a highly abundant blood protein), lipid transport processes including structural characterization of lipoproteins, and phospholipid-transfer proteins.

=== Clinical uses ===
The concentrations of fatty acids in blood serum or plasma can be measured using α-parinaric acid, which will compete for binding sites on serum albumin.

=== Food chemistry ===
α-Parinaric acid has been used to study the hydrophobicity and foaming characteristics of food proteins, as well as the foam stability of beer. In this latter research, α-parinaric acid was used in a fluorescent assay to assess the lipid–binding potential of the proteins in the beer, as these proteins help protect beer from foam–reducing medium– and long–chain fatty acids.

== Cytotoxic effects on tumor cells ==
α-Parinaric acid is cytotoxic to human leukemia cells in cell culture at concentrations of 5 μM or less, by sensitizing the tumor cells to lipid peroxidation, the process where free radicals react with electrons from cell membrane lipids, resulting in cell damage. It is similarly cytotoxic to malignant gliomas grown in cell culture. Normal (non-tumorous) astrocytes grown in culture are far less sensitive to the cytotoxic effects of α-parinaric acid. This preferential toxicity towards tumor cells is due to a differential regulation of c-Jun N-terminal kinase, and forkhead transcription factors between malignant and normal cells.
