= Stefan D. Anker =

German cardiologist

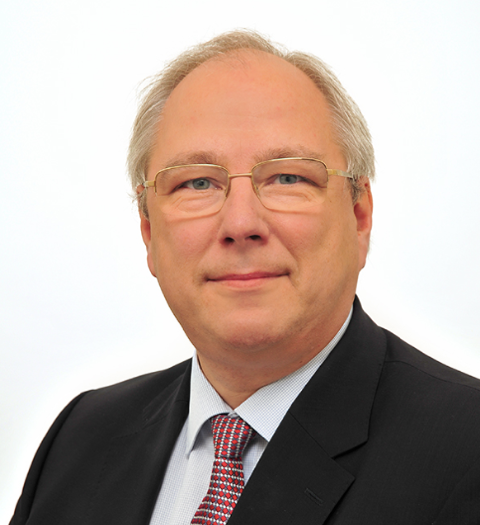
- Born: Berlin
- Education: Humboldt University Berlin, Imperial College London
- Known for: Researching heart failure
- Scientific career
- Fields: Cardiology, heart failure, muscle wasting, cachexia, sarcopenia, treatment development, drugs & devices, clinical trials
- Institutions: University Medical Center, Göttingen

Stefan D. Anker is a German cardiologist who is Head of Field "Tissue Homeostasis and Cachexia" at Charité University, Berlin, Germany. Previously, he was Professor of Innovative Clinical Trials at University Medical Center Göttingen in Germany. The main focus of the Innovative Clinical Trials department was research in the field of chronic heart failure, including the development and clinical testing of new therapies. As a W3 professor, he ranks in the top 1% worldwide experts in cachexia, sarcopenia, weight loss, iron deficiencies and heart failure according to the ScienceLeadR platform. Research.com places Stefan Anker as 111th best medicine scientist globally and in 2nd position in Germany.

== Education ==
Anker studied medicine at Charité Medical School of Humboldt-University Berlin, Germany (1987-1993) and completed his PhD at the National Heart and Lung Institute of Imperial College London, United Kingdom, in 1998.

== Career and research ==
Anker has had teaching appointments in the UK, Germany, Australia, Poland and Italy.

His particular research interests include the pathophysiology and treatment of acute and chronic heart failure (CHF), cardiac device therapy, clinical evaluation of cardiovascular biomarkers, pathophysiology of muscle wasting, cachexia therapy in CHF, ageing, sarcopenia and cancer.

Anker serves on the editorial boards of European Heart Journal and European Journal of Heart Failure. He is founding Editor-in-Chief of the Journal of Cachexia, Sarcopenia and Muscle and of ESC Heart Failure, which is the first open access heart failure journal.

Anker has won two American Heart Association Young Investigator Awards and has obtained two National Institutes of Health (NIH) grants (Warfarin Versus Aspirin in Reduced Cardiac Ejection Fraction (WARCEF) Trial), two grants from the EU's Seventh Framework Programme for Research (FP7), and one Innovative Medicines Initiative / Horizon 2020 grant. Recently Anker 's research included the role of low-level microcurrent stimulation in heart failure.

== Memberships ==
Anker has been a member of the German Cardiac Society and of the European Society of Cardiology (ESC) since 1995. He was vice president of the ESC between 2016-18 in charge of 'National Cardiac Societies and Communications.' He has been serving on the board of the ESC since 2012. In addition, he has been serving on the board of the Heart Failure Association (HFA) of the ESC since 2006. He was HFA President between 2012 and 2014 and he chairs the HFA committee on regulatory affairs.

Anker is the founding president of the International Society on Sarcopenia, Cachexia and Wasting Disorders (SCWD).

== Selected publications ==
Anker has authored more than 1400 original papers, reviews, and editorials. Total citations exceed 200,000, including over 50 papers with more than 200 citations. He has an h-index of 200.

- Anker, SD; Ponikowski, P; Varney, S; et al. (April 1997). "Wasting as independent risk factor for mortality in chronic heart failure". Lancet. 349 (9058): 1050–3. doi:10.1016/S0140-6736(96)07015-8. PMID 9107242. S2CID 27285694.
- Anker, SD; Chua, TP; Ponikowski, P; Harrington, D; Swan, JW; Kox, WJ; Poole-Wilson, PA; Coats, AJ (1997). "Hormonal changes and catabolic/anabolic imbalance in chronic heart failure and their importance for cardiac cachexia". Circulation. 96 (2): 526–34. doi:10.1161/01.cir.96.2.526. PMID 9244221.
- Niebauer, J; Volk, HD; Kemp, M; Dominguez, M; Schumann, RR; Rauchhaus, M; Poole-Wilson, PA; Coats, AJ; Anker, SD (1999). "Endotoxin and immune activation in chronic heart failure: a prospective cohort study". Lancet. 353 (9167): 1838–42. doi:10.1016/S0140-6736(98)09286-1. PMID 10359409. S2CID 34183643.
- Rauchhaus, M; Coats, AJ; Anker, SD (2000). "The endotoxin-lipoprotein hypothesis". Lancet. 356 (9233): 930–3. doi:10.1016/S0140-6736(00)02690-8. PMID 11036910. S2CID 27005597.
- Anker, SD; Negassa, A; Coats, AJ; et al. (March 2003). "Prognostic importance of weight loss in chronic heart failure and the effect of treatment with angiotensin-converting-enzyme inhibitors: an observational study". Lancet. 361 (9363): 1077–83. doi:10.1016/S0140-6736(03)12892-9. PMID 12672310. S2CID 24682546.
- Anker, SD; Doehner, W; Rauchhaus, M; Sharma, R; Francis, D; Knosalla, C; Davos, CH; Cicoira, M; Shamim, W; Kemp, M; Segal, R; Osterziel, KJ; Leyva, F; Hetzer, R; Ponikowski, P; Coats, AJ (2003). "Uric acid and survival in chronic heart failure: validation and application in metabolic, functional, and hemodynamic staging". Circulation. 107 (15): 1991–7. doi:10.1161/01.CIR.0000065637.10517.A0. PMID 12707250. S2CID 13323584.
- Anker, SD; Comin Colet, J; Filippatos, G; et al. (2009). "Ferric carboxymaltose in patients with heart failure and iron deficiency". N Engl J Med. 361 (25): 2436–48. doi:10.1056/NEJMoa0908355. hdl:11268/1142. PMID 19920054. S2CID 1755624.
- Maisel, A; Mueller, C; Nowak, R; Peacock, WF; Landsberg, JW; Ponikowski, P; Mockel, M; Hogan, C; Wu, AH; Richards, M; Clopton, P; Filippatos, GS; Di Somma, S; Anand, I; Ng, L; Daniels, LB; Neath, SX; Christenson, R; Potocki, M; McCord, J; Terracciano, G; Kremastinos, D; Hartmann, O; von Haehling, S; Bergmann, A; Morgenthaler, NG; Anker, SD (2010). "Mid-region pro-hormone markers for diagnosis and prognosis in acute dyspnea: results from the BACH (Biomarkers in Acute Heart Failure) trial". J Am Coll Cardiol. 55 (19): 2062–76. doi:10.1016/j.jacc.2010.02.025. PMID 20447528.
- Koehler, F; Winkler, S; Schieber, M; Sechtem, U; Stangl, K; Böhm, M; Boll, H; Baumann, G; Honold, M; Koehler, K; Gelbrich, G; Kirwan, BA; Anker, SD (2011). "Impact of remote telemedical management on mortality and hospitalizations in ambulatory patients with chronic heart failure: the telemedical interventional monitoring in heart failure study". Circulation. 123 (17): 1873–80. doi:10.1161/CIRCULATIONAHA.111.018473. PMID 21444883. S2CID 11473865.
- Anker, SD; Koehler, F; Abraham, WT (2011). "Telemedicine and remote management of patients with heart failure". Lancet. 378 (9792): 731–9. doi:10.1016/S0140-6736(11)61229-4. PMID 21856487. S2CID 10977216.
- von Haehling, S; Schefold, JC; Jankowska, EA; Springer, J; Vazir, A; Kalra, PR; Sandek, A; Fauler, G; Stojakovic, T; Trauner, M; Ponikowski, P; Volk, HD; Doehner, W; Coats, AJ; Poole-Wilson, PA; Anker, SD (2012). "Ursodeoxycholic acid in patients with chronic heart failure: a double-blind, randomized, placebo-controlled, crossover trial". J Am Coll Cardiol. 59 (6): 585–92. doi:10.1016/j.jacc.2011.10.880. PMID 22300693.
- Homma, S; Thompson, JL; Pullicino, PM; Levin, B; Freudenberger, RS; Teerlink, JR; Ammon, SE; Graham, S; Sacco, RL; Mann, DL; Mohr, JP; Massie, BM; Labovitz, AJ; Anker, SD; Lok, DJ; Ponikowski, P; Estol, CJ; Lip, GY; Di Tullio, MR; Sanford, AR; Mejia, V; Gabriel, AP; del Valle, ML; Buchsbaum, R (2012). "Warfarin and aspirin in patients with heart failure and sinus rhythm". N Engl J Med. 366 (20): 1859–69. doi:10.1056/NEJMoa1202299. PMC 3723382. PMID 22551105.
- Ponikowski, P; van Veldhuisen, DJ; Comin-Colet, J; Ertl, G; Komajda, M; Mareev, V; McDonagh, T; Parkhomenko, A; Tavazzi, L; Levesque, V; Mori, C; Roubert, B; Filippatos, G; Ruschitzka, F; Anker, SD (2015). "Beneficial effects of long-term intravenous iron therapy with ferric carboxymaltose in patients with symptomatic heart failure and iron deficiency†". Eur Heart J. 36 (11): 657–68. doi:10.1093/eurheartj/ehu385. PMC 4359359. PMID 25176939.
- Anker SD, Butler J, Filippatos G, Ferreira JP et al; EMPEROR-Preserved Trial Investigators. Empagliflozin in Heart Failure with a Preserved Ejection Fraction. N Engl J Med. 2021 Oct 14;385(16):1451-1461.
- Anker SD, Friede T, von Bardeleben RS, Butler J, Khan MS, Diek M, et al; RESHAPE-HF2 Investigators. Transcatheter Valve Repair in Heart Failure with Moderate to Severe Mitral Regurgitation. N Engl J Med. 2024 Nov 14;391(19):1799-1809. doi: 10.1056/NEJMoa2314328.
- Stone GW, Lindenfeld J, Rodés-Cabau J, Anker SD, Zile MR, et al; RELIEVE-HF Investigators. Interatrial Shunt Treatment for Heart Failure: The Randomized RELIEVE-HF Trial. Circulation. 2024 Dec 10;150(24):1931-1943.

== Consensus meetings and guidelines ==
Anker has participated in and chaired several consensus meeting and guidelines committees:

- Co-chair, Consensus Group "The definition of Cachexia" (Evans et al., Clinical Nutrition 2008)
- AHA Consensus Group "State of the science: promoting self-care in persons with heart failure: a scientific statement from the American Heart Association." (Riegel et al., Circulation 2009)
- ADQI 7 Consensus Group "Cardio-Renal Syndromes" (Ronco et al., Eur Heart J 2010)
- Co-chair, Consensus Group "Endpoints for Cachexia Trials & Nutrition for Cachexia and Sarcopenia" (Morley et al., JAMDA 2010)
- Nutritional recommendations for the management of sarcopenia. Co-chair. (Morley el al., JAMDA 2010)
- "Definition and classification of cancer cachexia" (Fearon et al. Lancet Oncol 2011)
- ESC/HFA Guideline on Diagnosis & treatment of acute and chronic heart failure (McMurray et al., EHJ 2012)
- HFA/WGTE of ESC Consensus on thromboembolism & anti-thrombotic therapy in heart failure with sinus rhythm (Lip et al. Eur J HF 2012)
- ESH/ESC Guidelines for the management of arterial hypertension. Reviewer. (Mancia et al. EHJ 2013)
- ESC/EASD Guidelines on diabetes, pre-diabetes, and cardiovascular diseases. (Ryden et al. EHJ 2013)
- SC/ESA 2014 Guidelines on non-cardiac surgery: cardiovascular assessment and management. (Kristensen et al. EHJ 2014)
- Reporting on patient reported outcomes in cardiovascular trials – Position statement of the ESC cardiovascular round table. (Anker et al. EHJ 2014)
- ESC/HFA Guideline on Diagnosis & treatment of acute and chronic heart failure (Ponikowski et al., EHJ 2016)

== Research ==
Anker has been a member of more than 30 international clinical trial steering committees, chairing or co-chairing more than 10 (including the FAIR-HF, TIM-HF, BACH, AUGMENT-HF, ACT-ONE, RESHAPE-HF2, IMPULSE-HF, FAIR-HF2, Fair-HFpEF, EMPEROR-PRESERVED HFpEF trials and RELIEVE-HF trial). He served in several data and safety monitoring boards (chairing five) and end-point committees (chairing three). In 2015 and again in 2016, he was named in the Thomson Reuters Highly Cited Researchers list.

== Honors and awards ==
- 2006: Samuel A. Levine Young Investigator Award (Clinical Cardiology) for the AHA for the paper: Okonko D, Poole-Wilson PA, Anker SD, Ponikowski P. Intravenous iron therapy in patients with chronic heart failure with and without anemia
- 2018: Copernicus Award from the Deutsche Forschungsgemeinschaft (DFG, German Research Foundation) and the Fundacja na rzecz Nauki Polskiej (FNP, Foundation for Polish Science) for services to German-Polish research collaboration
- 2020: Doctor honoris causa, Medical University of Wroclaw — Awarded in recognition of his decades of contributions to cardiovascular medicine and his longstanding research collaboration with Polish cardiologists, notably Prof. Piotr Ponikowski.
- 2021: Doctor honoris causa, Semmelweis University, Budapest — Awarded for his advancements in cardiology and long-standing partnerships with Hungarian physicians and researchers
