= George Eman Vaillant =

American psychiatrist (born 1934)

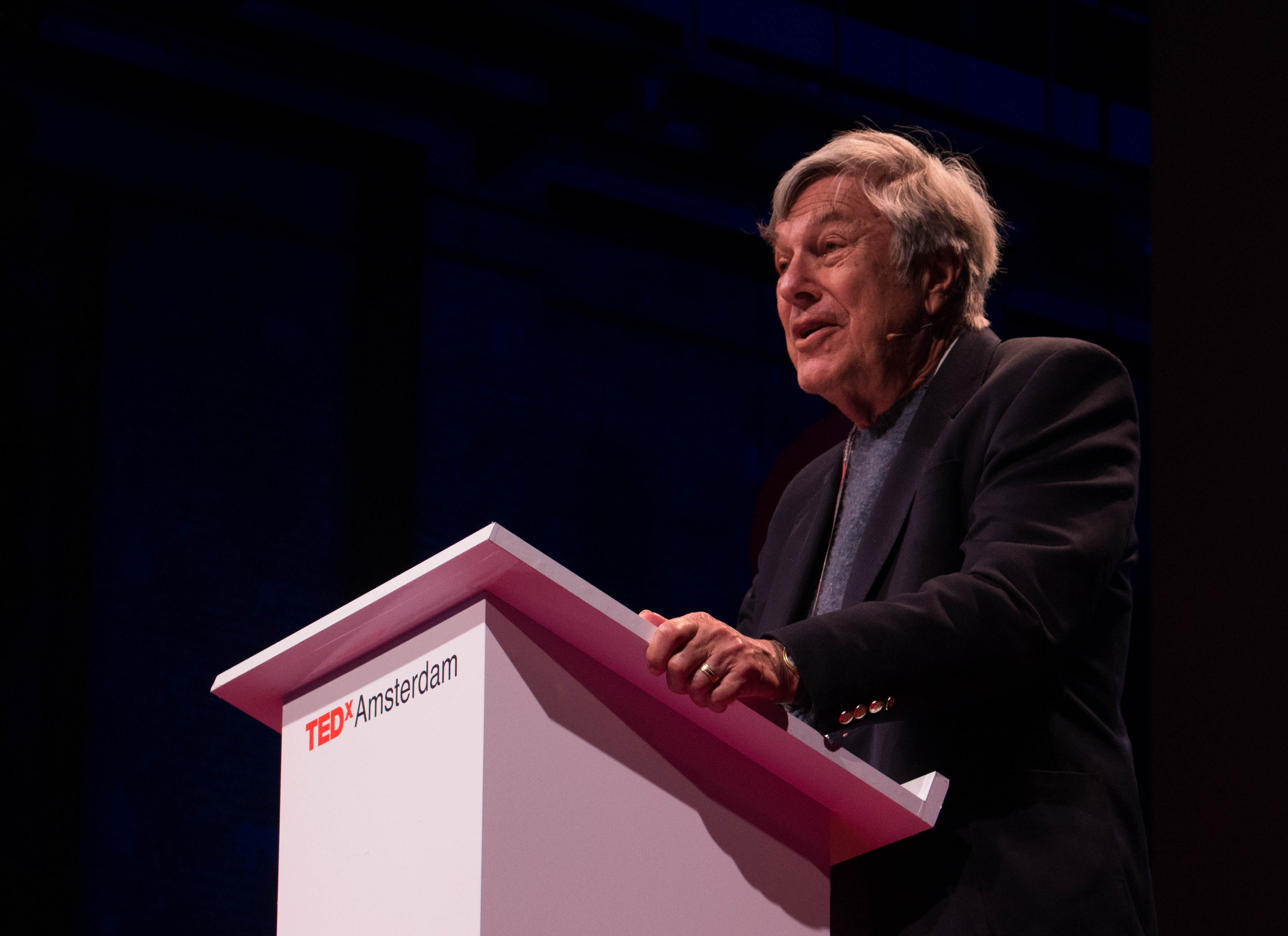
George Vaillant speaking at TEDxAmsterdam, 2014

George Eman Vaillant (/vəˈlænt/; born June 16, 1934) is an American psychiatrist and Professor at Harvard Medical School and Director of Research for the Department of Psychiatry, Brigham and Women's Hospital. Vaillant has spent his research career charting adult development and the recovery process of schizophrenia, heroin addiction, alcoholism, and personality disorder. Through 2003, he spent 30 years as Director of the Study of Adult Development at the Harvard University Health Service. The study has prospectively charted the lives of 724 men and women for over 60 years.

== Biography ==
George Eman Vaillant's father, George Clapp Vaillant, killed himself in 1945. George Eman, who was 10 years old at the time, was traumatized by his father's suicide and thus had deep emotional reasons for being interested in psychiatry. He graduated from Harvard College and Harvard Medical School, did his psychiatric residency at the Massachusetts Mental Health Center and completed his psychoanalytic training at the Boston Psychoanalytic Institute. He has been a Fellow at the Center for Advanced Study in the Behavioral Sciences, is a Fellow of the American College of Psychiatrists and has been an invited speaker and consultant for seminars and workshops throughout the world.

A major focus of his work in the past has been to develop ways of studying defense mechanisms empirically. He creating a four-level hierarchy of defense mechanisms, which he categorized as pathological (originally called psychotic), immature, neurotic, and mature. (Source: Ego Mechanisms of Defense: A Guide for Clinicians and Researchers 1st Edition by Professor of Psychiatry George E Vaillant M.D. )

Pathological (Psychotic)

The mechanisms on this level are normal in very young children, but in adults, when predominating, almost always are severely pathological. These defenses, in conjunction, permit patients to rearrange external experiences to eliminate the need to cope with reality.

1. Delusional Projection: Grossly frank delusions about external reality, usually of a persecutory nature.

2. Denial: Refusal to accept external reality because it is too threatening; arguing against an anxiety-provoking stimulus by stating it doesn't exist; resolution of emotional conflict and reduction of anxiety by refusing to perceive or consciously acknowledge the more unpleasant aspects of external reality.

3. Distortion: A gross reshaping of external reality to meet internal needs.

4. Splitting: A primitive defense. Negative and positive impulses are split off and unintegrated. Fundamental example: An individual views other people as either innately good or innately evil, rather than a whole continuous being.

5. Identity Dissociation – Severe form of dissociation in which there is not only emotional detachment but also detachment from physical experiences as well. There is complete detachment from reality.

Immature

These mechanisms are common in children and adolescents. They can occur in adults, but when they do generally reflect a lack of awareness and/or personal growth. These mechanisms lessen distress and anxiety provoked by threatening people or by uncomfortable reality. In adolescence, the occurrence of all of these defenses is normal.

1. Acting out: Direct expression of an unconscious wish or impulse in action, without conscious awareness of the emotion that drives that expressive behavior.

2. Fantasy: Tendency to retreat into fantasy in order to resolve inner and outer conflicts.

3. Idealization: Unconsciously choosing to perceive another individual as having more positive qualities than he or she may actually have.

4. Passive aggression: Aggression towards others expressed indirectly or passively such as using procrastination.

5. Projection: Projection is a primitive form of paranoia. Projection also reduces anxiety by allowing the expression of the undesirable impulses or desires without becoming consciously aware of them; attributing one's own unacknowledged unacceptable/unwanted thoughts and emotions to another.

6. Projective identification: The object of projection invokes in that person precisely the thoughts, feelings or behaviors projected.

7. Somatization: The transformation of negative feelings towards others into negative feelings toward self, pain, illness, and anxiety.

Neurotic

These mechanisms are considered neurotic but can be common in adults. Such defenses have short-term advantages in coping, but can often cause long-term problems in relationships, work and in enjoying life when used as one's primary style of coping with the world.

1. Displacement: shifts sexual or aggressive impulses to a more acceptable or less threatening target; redirecting emotion to a safer outlet

2. Dissociation: Temporary separation or postponement of a feeling that normally would accompany a situation/thought.

3. Hypochondriasis: An excessive preoccupation or worry about having a serious illness.

4. Intellectualization: A form of isolation; concentrating on the intellectual components of a situation so as to distance oneself from the associated anxiety-provoking emotions.

5. Isolation: Separation or complete detachment of feelings from ideas and events.

6. Rationalization (Making excuses): Where a person convinces him or herself that no wrong was done and that all is or was all right through faulty and false reasoning - making excuses.

7. Reaction formation (Over compensation): Converting wishes/impulses that are perceived to be dangerous into their opposites; behavior that is the opposite of what one really wants/feels

8. Regression: Temporary reversion of the ego to an earlier stage of development rather than handling unacceptable impulses in a more adult way.

9. Repression: the process of attempting to repel desires towards pleasurable instincts, the desire is moved to the unconscious in the attempt to prevent it from entering consciousness.

10. Undoing (Restitution): A person tries to 'undo' an unhealthy, destructive or otherwise threatening thought by engaging in contrary behavior

11. Withdrawal (Avoidance): Inaction due to feeling anxious or overwhelmed or depressed

Mature

These are commonly found among emotionally healthy adults and are considered mature. These defenses help us integrate conflicting emotions and thoughts, while still remaining effective.

1. Altruism: Constructive service to others that brings pleasure and personal satisfaction.

2. Anticipation: Realistic planning for future discomfort.

3. Acceptance: Choosing to live with uncomfortable feelings or outcomes

4. Humor: Overt expression of ideas and feelings (especially those that are unpleasant to focus on or too terrible to talk about) that gives pleasure to others.

5. Identification: The unconscious modeling of oneself upon another person's character and behavior.

6. Introjection: Identifying with some idea or object so deeply that it becomes a part of that person. A father tells a son that men work hard so the son internalizes this idea into his way of thinking.

7. Sublimation: Transformation of negative emotions or instincts into positive actions, behavior, or emotion. (such as playing football to release anger).

8. Thought suppression: The conscious process of pushing thoughts into the preconscious; the conscious decision to delay paying attention to an emotion or need in order to cope with the present reality; making it possible to later access uncomfortable or distressing emotions while accepting them

(Source: Ego Mechanisms of Defense: A Guide for Clinicians and Researchers 1st Edition by Professor of Psychiatry George E Vaillant M.D. )

More recently, he has been interested in successful aging and human happiness. In 2008, he took up a supervisory role for psychiatric trainees at St. Vincent's Hospital in Melbourne, Australia. In June 2009, Joshua Wolf Shenk published an article in the Atlantic Monthly entitled "What Makes Us Happy?" which focused on Vaillant's work in the Grant Study, a study of 268 men over many decades.

Vaillant has been married four times, once to psychotherapist Leigh McCullough. He currently lives in California with his present wife, Diane Highum, MD, a clinical research psychiatrist in Orange County, CA, who also graduated from Harvard Medical School. They continue to have friends from earlier days at HMS, most of whom reside in New England, as do many other members of George's family.

== Awards ==
Vaillant has received the Foundations Fund Prize for Research in Psychiatry from the American Psychiatric Association, the Strecker Award from The Pennsylvania Hospital, the Burlingame Award from The Institute for Living, and the Jellinek Award for research on alcoholism. In 1995 he received the research prize of the International Psychogeriatric Society.

== Editorial board membership ==
Vaillant sits on the Honorary International Advisory Board of the Mens Sana Monographs.

He joined the board of trustees of Alcoholics Anonymous as a Class A (non-alcoholic) trustee in 1998.

== Books ==
- Vaillant, GE (1977), Adaptation to Life, Boston, MA, Little, Brown, 1977 (also Lippincott Williams & Wilkins, Hardcover, 396pp ISBN 0-316-89520-2) [also German, Korean and Chinese translations] (Reprinted with a new preface in 1995 by Harvard University Press, Cambridge, MA)
- Vaillant, GE (1983), Natural History of Alcoholism, Cambridge, MA, Harvard University Press
- Vaillant, GE (1992), Ego Mechanisms of Defense: A Guide for Clinicians and Researchers, Washington, DC, American Psychiatric Press
- Vaillant, GE (1993), The Wisdom of the Ego, Cambridge, MA, Harvard University Press, ISBN 0-674-95373-8
- Vaillant, GE (1995), The Natural History of Alcoholism Revisited, Cambridge, MA, Harvard University Press, [also (Brazilian) Portuguese translation]
- Vaillant, GE (2002), Aging Well, Boston, Little Brown, ISBN 0-316-09007-7
- Vaillant, GE (2008), Spiritual Evolution: A Scientific Defense of Faith, Broadway Books, ISBN 0-7679-2657-9
- Vaillant, GE (2012), Triumphs of Experience: The Men of the Harvard Grant Study, Belknap Press, ISBN 0-674-05982-4
- Vaillant, GE (2017), Heaven on My Mind: Using the Harvard Grant Study of Adult Development to Explore the Value of the Prospection of Life After Death, Nova Science Publishers, Inc., ISBN 1536121134

== See also ==
- Postponement of affect
- Career consolidation
- Keeper of the Meaning
