= Sarcopenic obesity =

Medical condition: obesity and loss of muscle

Sarcopenic obesity is a combination of two disease states, sarcopenia and obesity. Sarcopenia is the muscle mass/strength/physical function loss associated with increased age, and obesity is based on a weight to height ratio or body mass index (BMI) that is characterized by high body fat or being overweight.

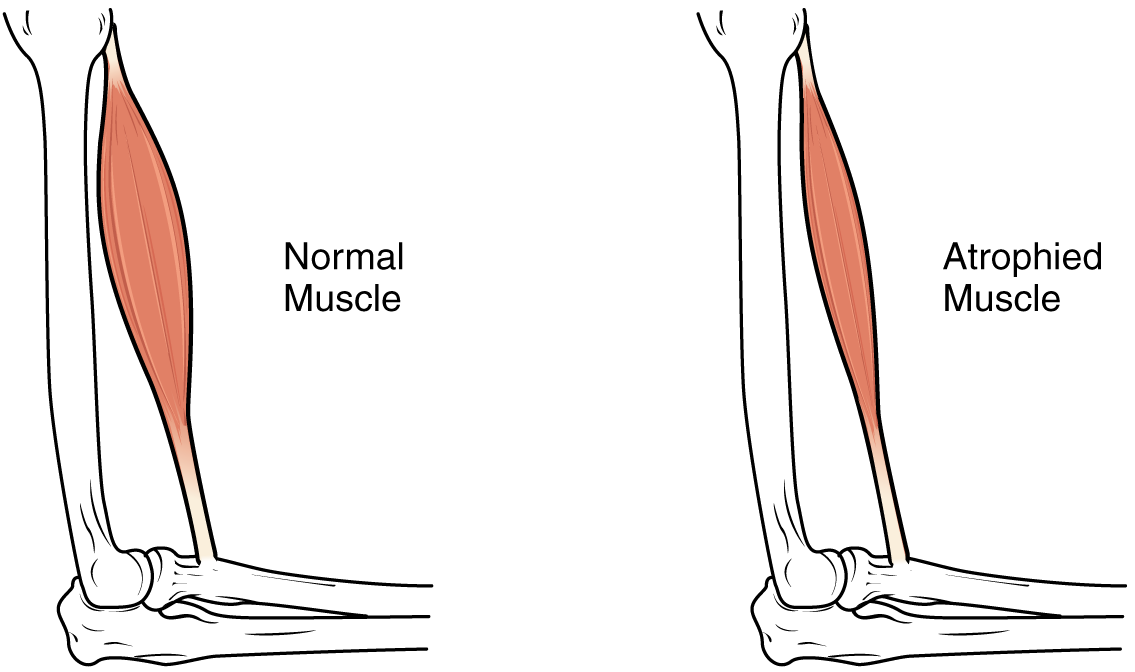
Sarcopenia

The risk of sarcopenic obesity increases with age, and its consequences are a health concern in an ageing population. This condition accelerates muscle mass and function loss as mentioned above, and is a particular concern for the elderly due to its compounding effects on mobility and overall health.

Obesity

An increased subset of adults over the age of 65 have been classified as having sarcopenic obesity. There is an association between the loss in muscle mass/strength/physical function of sarcopenia and high body fat in obesity as the increased inactivity (sedentary lifestyle) that can occur with a loss in physical function and aging can lead to increase in weight as body fat increases.

In regard to sarcopenic obesity prevalence, it is highest among Asian males at 14.4%. Therefore, there is a critical need for a consensus definition for sarcopenic obesity and thus its clinical importance. There is limited additional data among different populations means that future retrospective research studies could clarify statistical data and provide more robust evidence. However, this does not preclude a relationship between the two conditions or dismiss the possibility of associated symptoms and or health complications.

These two disease states are synergistic or linked together, as the increase in progression of one disease state increases the severity of the other and vice versa. A Pearson Chi-Square test performed on a sample size of 1637 patients from 2019 to 2021 in community/outpatient clinics at Prince of Wales Hospital determined that Obesity is a risk factor of sarcopenia when obesity is defined as BF% compared to BMI. This can be attributed to high amounts of lean tissue or high muscle mass even though the clinical BMI can be diagnosed as obesity.

== Pathogenesis ==
The pathogenesis of sarcopenic obesity involves multiple factors, including aging, lack of physical activity, malnutrition/vitamin imbalances, insulin resistance, and hormonal changes -> body composition changes. The exact pathophysiology is not well understood, however these factors have been studied in the production of sarcopenic obesity. These factors increase ectopic/omental fat deposition, insulin resistance, while decreasing metabolic rate, physical activity, and anabolic hormones.

It is thought that GDF15 and FGF21 (protein/cytokine that is biomarker for cell injury/inflammation in response to stress) are increased in sarcopenic obesity. Myostatin is also increased. In the fat, lipotoxicity and chronic inflammation are increased in addition to accumulation of immune cells. In the muscle, mitochondrial dysfunction, oxidative stress (imbalance of free radicals and antioxidants that can lead to cell damage), myosteaosis (fat accumulation in skeletal muscles), and anabolic resistance (reduced stimulation of muscle to amount of protein) can occur.

Overall, the cycle of adipose and muscle tissues lead to expansion of white adipose tissue into muscle tissue. This inhibits protein synthesis, resulting in decline of muscle mass and promotes other mechanisms e.g. insulin resistance. The release of cytokines as well inhibits insulin production, and other mechanisms that increase risk of disease e.g. Cardiovascular issues that increase risk of death and decreased life span.

== Symptoms ==
The symptoms are similar to those of sarcopenia and obesity. The individual may show a body mass index that is appropriate and healthy to his or her age but will look fat in appearance.

People who have sarcopenia are experiencing gradual loss of muscle. This condition commonly presents as reduced endurance, reduced speed while walking, imbalance with increased risk of falls, struggles with everyday activity, difficulty climbing stairs, and loss of muscle size.

Sarcopenic obesity also involves obesity. People living with obesity experience an array of symptoms, including difficulty breathing, joint and back pain, a limited ability to participate in physical tasks, snoring, frequently experiencing fatigue, and excessive perspiration. In some patients, a range of comorbidities can coincide with sarcopenic obesity, for example cardiovascular disease, dementia, fractures, diabetes, and even some cancers. In some cases, if a person already has pre-existing conditions, they can worsen if they develop sarcopenic obesity. The effects of obesity are not only physical, people can also have some mental effects. Some of these include, low confidence which can present as doubting ones ability, worry, uncertainty, and being hesitant while assigned or performing tasks. People with obesity also tend to have low self-esteem.

== Causes ==
Sarcopenic obesity primarily stems from changes in body composition due to an increase in age, hormonal changes, lack of exercise and a healthy diet, and other diseases.

=== Aging ===
Aging is the main factor that leads to a change in body composition. These are mainly decreases in muscle strength, increases in total fat mass, and decreases in peripheral subcutaneous fat, all of which can also be attributed to a decline in exercise and reduced basal metabolic rate. Hormonal changes also occur as a person ages, resulting in further changes in muscle composition.

=== Hormonal Changes ===
Insulin resistance often increases as a person ages and is commonly linked with obesity. Obesity is often characterized as extreme adipose tissue growth due to a decrease in energy expenditure as well as an increase in nutrition. Obesity can also lead to inflammation, which plays an additional factor in causing insulin resistance. Insulin plays a powerful role in protein synthesis since it increases intracellular uptake of short-chain amino acids and regulates expression of albumin and myosin. Insulin's regulation of hepatic and muscle cell enzymes also helps control protein degradation. Thus, insulin resistance can lead to an increase in protein breakdown and a decrease in protein synthesis in skeletal muscle.

Obesity can also lead to lower levels of testosterone, insulin-like growth factor 1 (IGF-1), and other anabolic hormones. The high amount of circulating free fatty acids also inhibits growth hormone production. These hormonal changes are often associated with a loss in muscle strength and mass.

=== Inflammation ===
Inflammation is one of the key factors that contributes to the reduction of muscle mass and strength among sarcopenic obesity. Adipose tissue secretes hormones and proteins, such as pro-inflammatory cytokines (TNF-α, IL-6, and IL-1) and adipokines (lectin and adiponectin).

Because there is a larger number of adipose tissue in those that are obese, the inflammatory response is up-regulated. This inflammation can induce insulin resistance, leading to a decrease in skeletal muscle strength and mass. Inflammation can also directly cause muscle atrophy by suppressing protein synthesis and inducing the breakdown of proteins. It indirectly affects muscle mass by causing metabolic disorders in the digestive system, liver, and other cells.

==== Exercise ====
One of the factors that cause sarcopenic obesity is a decline in physical activity, often as a result of aging. This decrease in exercise leads to a decrease in muscle mass and strength. This leads to a decrease in basal metabolic rate, allowing for a greater accumulation of fat. As the body continues to age, the lack of physical activity, as well as other factors, further prevents a person from continuously exercising. In addition, a lack of exercise can lead to decreases in muscle protein synthesis and affect hormonal balances.

== Diagnosis ==
Sarcopenic obesity is a combination of high body fat and low body mass index. Can be diagnosed by measures such as waist-hip ratio.

Sarcopenic obesity is defined as the presence of increased levels of adipose tissue and a below average muscle mass and function in a patient. Diagnostic procedure for sarcopenic obesity involves a number of body composition assessments a person has to undergo. Sarcopenic obesity is slightly more challenging to diagnose compared to other disease and it tends to be under diagnosed in all populations. This is a condition that is thought to affect the older population since as people age, they tend to lose muscle mass. Older people are also less likely to engage in physical activity and this can lead to an increase in weight. The intricate definition of sarcopenic obesity is thought to cause people to be under-diagnosed especially in the younger population. Some research points to anthropometric diagnosis based on south Asian cut offs to be the most efficacious way to diagnose sarcopenic obesity. Anthropometric measurements is defined as human measurements. Diagnosing using this method involves a non-intrusive assessable measurements of the body. The measurements are height, weight, body mass index (BMI), head circumferences, skinfold thickness, and circumferences of waist, hip and limbs. Normal values are set by the Centers for Disease Control and Prevention (CDC) or World Health Organization (WHO) based on a nutritional status evaluation and people with abnormal values undergo further evaluation. Abnormal values for obesity is a BMI greater than 30 kg/m^2 or by fat levels and also modified body composition caused by low skeletal muscle operation and mass.

== Treatment ==
As of now, there are no therapies that directly cure sarcopenic obesity. However, there are a few strategies, including lifestyle modifications and pharmacological, that can manage both disease states. An appropriate weight training and weight loss program can help to improve the patient's condition.

=== Weight Loss + Exercise ===
Through caloric restriction of at least 10%, weight loss is feasible. Though, through weight loss by diet changes, this may cause the loss of muscle mass and body mass index which exacerbates the effects of sarcopenia. Regular exercise, along with diet changes has shown to reduce muscle mass loss and increase muscle strength. Incorporating progressive resistance training may counteract sarcopenia by causing muscle hypertrophy and encouraging muscle protein synthesis. Elastic resistance training incorporated into exercise also has shown to reduce muscle mass loss while losing weight. This is important for patients to implement into their routine in order to both lose weight without losing muscle mass. In patients that combined both effective weight loss and exercise, muscle strength increased while body mass decreased, indicating that there was an increase in muscle mass. This method is known to be the most effective treatment for sarcopenic obesity.

=== Nutrition ===
As individuals age, their body composition, amount of physical activity, and diet contribute to their decrease in muscle mass. Protein, on the other hand, is a necessary macronutrient for building muscle. Although protein is an important component to a balanced meal, older patients start to lose the ability to synthesize muscle through protein and amino acid consumption, and even if elderly patients increase their protein intake, studies show that muscle mass synthesis does not increase compared to young patients. Instead, elderly patients should focus on consuming high quality protein containing leucine, an amino acid. Since sarcopenic obesity is mostly prevalent in elderly patients, it is important to consume the appropriate amount of protein to prevent muscle mass loss. Magnesium, selenium, and vitamin D supplementation may also aid in muscle mass.

=== Myostatin Inhibitors ===
Myostatin is a protein found on muscle cells that inhibit the growth of muscles. Elderly patients are known to have higher levels of myostatin compared to younger patients, thus this protein poses a risk of developing sarcopenia. By inhibiting this protein, it may help reduce the process of muscle breakdown. Elderly mice that were administered myostatin inhibitors showed to have lower levels of fat and denser muscles compared to mice that did not take myostatin inhibitors. They suggest that reducing levels of myostatin in the elderly may lessen the chance of heart disease, diabetes, and sarcopenia. Although most data seems promising for animals, there is limited and ongoing research on humans.

=== Testosterone ===
Testosterone levels are much lower in elderly individuals compared to younger individuals, and lower than normal testosterone levels in males are linked to pathologies such as cardiovascular risks, obesity, and sarcopenia. One study illustrated that both younger and older males on testosterone therapy showed improvement on muscle mass via testosterone enanthate injections, and another study described decreased fat mass in older males over the age of 65 via testosterone patches. This type of treatment is dependent on serum testosterone levels of male patients, and is not the sole type of treatment for sarcopenic obesity.

== Complications/Conclusions ==
Low muscle mass or obesity are risk factors for reduced physical capacity and quality of life.

As a result of sarcopenic obesity, the risk of cardiovascular disease, cancer, type 2 diabetes, fractures, disability, and quality of life as above is affected. This is important because it is associated with all-cause mortality. In the event of early diagnosis, preventative treatment to delay the degradation of muscle and weight/fat management could prove to be beneficial.

Preventatively, a diet high in protein combined with physical activity outdoors can reduce the risk of sarcopenic obesity. With the controllable risk factors being lack of physical activity and malnutrition/vitamin imbalances, mitigating these can improve outcomes. Physical activity and proper nutritional supplementation is one of the important non-pharmacological options to delay and/or treat sarcopenic obesity, but it does come with limitations. If the individual cannot engage in physical activity, or is limited in walking capacity or higher intensity exercise can be a limitation to muscle growth beyond the age. Alternatively, if the individual does not have high amounts of muscle mass to begin with building muscle at a later age can prove to be challenging due to sarcopenia.

== See also ==
- Normal weight obesity
- Weight training
- Waist-to-height ratio
- Journal of Cachexia, Sarcopenia and Muscle
