= Career consolidation =

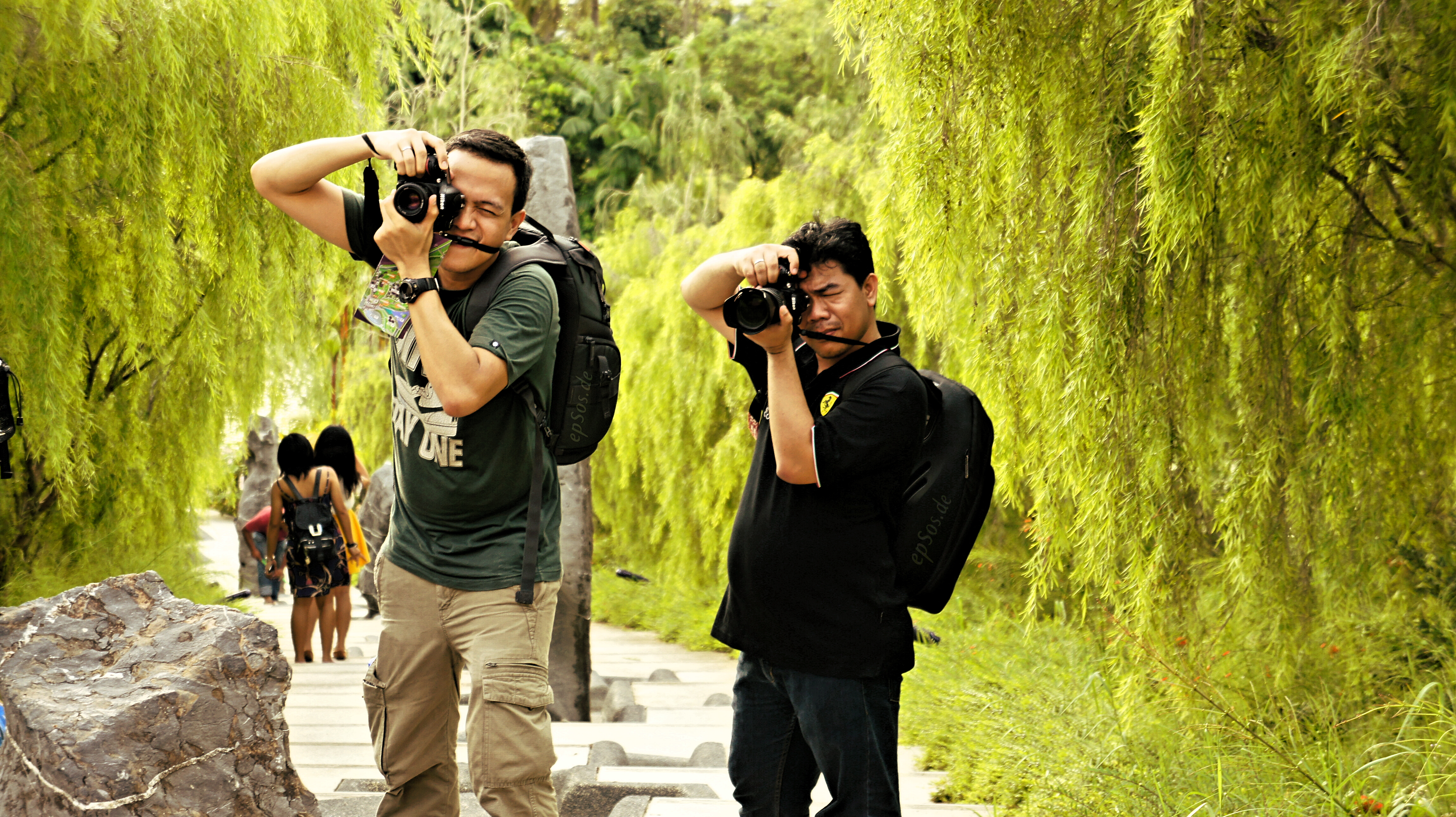
These young adults demonstrate career consolidation by transforming their passion for photography into a career.

Career consolidation is a stage of adult development which involves "expanding one's personal identity to assume a social identity within the world of work." This stage was developed by George Vaillant in 1977 and added to Erikson's stages of psychosocial development, between intimacy vs. isolation and generativity vs. stagnation. This stage covers the ages of 25 to 35. Vaillant contrasts career consolidation with self-absorption.

To transform a job or hobby into a career, Vaillant argues that four criteria are necessary: contentment, compensation, competence, and commitment.

Adult Development has demonstrated that intimacy, career consolidation, and generativity are mastered in the order stated, which is the case for both men and women. This explanation comes from the idea that, in order for one to love their work (career consolidation), they should first love their spouses (intimacy). Likewise, in order for one to care for others (generativity), they should first love their work (career consolidation).

== See also ==
- George Eman Vaillant
- Erikson's stages of psychosocial development
- Keeper of the Meaning
