= Society on Sarcopenia, Cachexia and Wasting Disorders =

International non-profit organization

Society on Sarcopenia, Cachexia and Wasting Disorders (SCWD) is an international and multidisciplinary non-profit organization, created in 2008 that focuses on cachexia and sarcopenia. As they are often under-diagnosed, patient groups aim to improve their awareness. Cachexia has been coined the "last illness" and is sometimes called "body wasting". The prevalence of cachexia ranges from 5–15% in end-stage chronic heart failure to 50–80% in advanced malignant cancer. It is estimated that 5 Million Americans have the condition and cachexia frequently occurs in patients with chronic kidney disease, chronic obstructive pulmonary disease (COPD), HIV, Multiple sclerosis, neurological diseases, and rheumatoid arthritis. Mortality rates of cachexia patients range from 15 to 25% per year in severe COPD, 20–40% per year in patients with chronic heart failure or chronic kidney disease, to 20–80% per year in cancer cachexia. The SCWD was founded in 2008 on the initiative of Prof. Stefan D. Anker in Germany and Dr. John E. Morley in the US. It is made up of an international and multidisciplinary group of healthcare professionals in the fields of sarcopenia, cachexia and muscle wasting. As of 2018, the society had 150 members.Journal of Cachexia, Sarcopenia and Muscle - Wiley Online Library

The purpose and objectives of the Society on Sarcopenia, Cachexia and Wasting Disorders (SCWD) are to:

- Improve the understanding, diagnosis and treatment of skeletal muscle wasting in various disease conditions and aging
- Educate healthcare professionals
- Form partnerships with other professional societies

== Legal Structure and Board ==
The SCWD is a non-profit scientific organization (501 c3) registered in the United States of America and Switzerland. The president is Prof. Stefan Anker, Germany who is also vice-president of the European Society of Cardiology, the vice-president is Dr. John Morley, USA and the treasurer is Prof. Andrew J. Coats, United Kingdom who particularly investigated cardiac cachexia at an early stage.
The Board consists of:
Stefan D. Anker (President) – Berlin, Germany
Josep M. Argiles – Barcelona, Spain
Vickie E. Baracos – Edmonton, Canada
Andrew J. S. Coats (Treasurer) – Norwich, UK
Wolfram Doehner – Berlin, Germany
William J. Evans – Duke University, US
Luigi Ferrucci – Baltimore, US
David J. Glass – Boston, US
Akio Inui – Kobe, Japan
Aminah Jatoi – Rochester, US
Kamyar Kalantar-Zadeh – Los Angeles, US
John E. Morley (vice-president) – St. Louis, US
Filippo Rossi-Fanelli – Rome, Italy
Florian Strasser – St. Gallen, Switzerland
Stephan von Haehling – Göttingen, Germany

Prof Ken Fearon was a board member until he died in September 2016. He received the Hippocrates Award from the Society. Professor Fearon was particularly involved in cancer cachexia: leading an international consensus.

== Educational initiatives ==
=== Conferences ===
Since 2000 the SCWD has organized several international conferences. In December 2009, the 5th Cachexia conference took place in Barcelona, Spain. In 2011, the 7th conference took place in Italy. One of them took place in Kobe, Japan. These conferences took place every two years until 2015, when in Paris it was decided to organize the conferences annually instead. The location of the 2016 congress is Berlin on 10–11 December 2016. The programme includes a statistical seminar, a mentor or career session and sessions on cachexia, sarcopenia and muscle wasting.

It addresses frailty, sarcopenia and cachexia resulting from the following diseases or chronic conditions: Cancer, Cardiovascular Disease, Death, Dying & Grief, Dementia/Alzheimer's Disease, Diabetes, Heart Failure and Ageing. Update on Anabolic and Related Therapies are also provided. Results of clinical trials are also presented, such as data from a Phase II clinical trial of MT-102 in cancer-related cachexia presented in Kobe in 2013. The latest conference took place in Maastricht in 2018.Journal of Cachexia, Sarcopenia and Muscle - Wiley Online Library In 2019, the international conference will take place in Berlin. Journal of Cachexia, Sarcopenia and Muscle - Wiley Online Library

Target audience: Internists, Oncologists, Geriatricians, Cardiologists, Nephrologists, Palliative care specialists, Nurse Practitioners and Primary Care Providers.

A charity dinner is sometimes organised during SCWD conferences such as in 2011 in Milan with the participation of Lisa Niemi.

Posters: each meeting features 120-200 posters.

The SCWD releases regular highlights of its meetings.

=== Consensus meetings ===
Since 2006, the SCWD has also organized several consensus meetings to address issues related to the definition of cachexia, sarcopenia as well the regulatory pathways for treatment development in cachexia, sarcopenia and the syndrome of muscle wasting.
The major objective was to bring together a multi-disciplinary team of experts in order to develop, as a united body, a consensus of statements based on the following topics:

- Definitions of Cachexia, Sarcopenia and Frailty with a proposal for an overall disease classification system of "Muscle Wasting Syndromes" as framework of reference.
- Classification.
- Body composition assessment.
- End-points in clinical trials, including Patient-reported outcomes.
- Nutrition.
- Endpoint in clinical trials: strengths and weaknesses.
- What constitutes clinically meaningful change.
- New regulatory pathways.

This consensus gathered together about 30 international scientists, including representatives from regulatory authorities. The invited experts are well-recognized academic leaders in geriatrics, oncology, cardiology, pulmonology and regulatory issues.
These consensus projects aimed to facilitate the future design and performance of clinical trials in the fields of cachexia and sarcopenia They also generated recommendations for nutritional management.

== Journal ==
The Journal of Cachexia, Sarcopenia and Muscle (JCSM) published by Wiley-Blackwell is the official journal of SCWD. It was created in 2010. According to the Journal Citation Reports, the journal has a 2017 impact factor of 12.511. JCSM has seen an increase in citations and submissions in 2016. It is ranked in the first 10 journals for all journals in the field of "medicine, general and internal. Two daughter journals also exist: JCSM—Clinical Reports started in July 2016 and JCSM—Rapid Communications.

== About muscle wasting, cachexia and sarcopenia ==
Cachexia is a major issue, especially in the elderly. Cachexia can occur in most major diseases including infections, cancer, heart disease, chronic kidney disease, chronic obstructive pulmonary disease, and stroke. Skeletal muscle provides a fundamental basis for human function, enabling locomotion and respiration. Muscle wasting is related to poor quality of life and increased morbidity/mortality. Two common but distinct conditions characterized by a loss of skeletal muscle mass are sarcopenia and cachexia. Sarcopenia and cachexia represent the major causes of muscle-wasting disorders. It has been known for millennia that muscle and fat wasting leads to poor outcomes, including deaths in chronic disease states.
It is usually accompanied by physical inactivity, decreased mobility, slow gait, and poor physical endurance, which are also common features of the frailty syndrome.
Cachexia and sarcopenia are both characterized by an important muscle dysfunction and weakness that lead to increased morbidity and mortality. The cost of muscle wasting is high.
