= Sarcopenic dysphagia =

Swallowing disorder

Sarcopenic dysphagia is a swallowing disorder caused by sarcopenia where there is a decrease in mass, strength and function of the skeletal muscles in the body, including the swallowing muscles. This may result in a decrease in swallowing function.

== Definitions ==
Sarcopenia is a decline in muscle strength, mass and function. It may be either part of the physiological process of aging or caused by systemic issues such as malnutrition, physical inactivity, inflammatory diseases or cancer. Sarcopenia affects all the skeletal muscles in the body and may also affect the swallowing muscles.

Dysphagia is used to describe a difficulty in swallowing and therefore eating. Depending on the severity, there may be trouble swallowing solid food or even liquids.

Sarcopenic dysphagia means dysphagia that caused by sarcopenia and can therefore only be diagnosed when there is sarcopenia of the whole body.

== Clinical relevance ==
The process of swallowing is both a voluntary and involuntary process, as many of the swallowing-related muscles receive direct input stimulation from the respiratory center of the brainstem. Though the swallowing muscles are histologically speaking striated muscles, they are embryologically different from other skeletal muscles.

Since malnutrition is an important risk factor for sarcopenia and sarcopenia can lead to dysphagia, which can in turn worsen intake and thus worsen malnutrition, sarcopenic dysphagia can become somewhat of a vicious cycle. With our aging population, there is more and more relevance for "healthy aging". A review from 2024 by Deng et al. emphasises the importance of a multidisciplinary approach to the treatment of sarcopenic dysphagia.

Eating is also crucial for maintaining quality of life. Communal eating has been found to be a human universal, whether in big groups or just at home with loved ones. Social eating is a form of bonding and more than just the ingestion of nutrients

== Diagnosis ==
Consensus diagnostic criteria for sarcopenic dysphagia were proposed during a symposium at the 19th Annual Meeting of the Japanese Society of Dysphagia Rehabilitation. This is based primarily on the presence of dysphagia and sarcopenia. The following diagnostic criteria must be assessed:

1. Presence of dysphagia.
2. Presence of whole-body sarcopenia.
3. A loss of swallowing muscle mass that is seen on imaging tests (CT, MRI, ultrasound).
4. Other causes of dysphagia (except sarcopenia) are excluded.
5. Sarcopenia is considered to be the main cause for the dysphagia if other causes (such as stroke) exist.

A definite diagnosis can be made if points 1, 2, 3 and 4 are presence. The presence of points 1, 2 and 4 indicates a probable diagnosis and the presence of points 1, 2 and 5 indicate a possible diagnosis.

== Etymology ==
The term Sarcopenic dysphagia was first introduced in Japan in 2012 by Prof. Hidetaka Wakabayashi and first used in English by Kuroda et al. in the same year. Sarcopenia was derived from the Greek words σάρξ (sarx) for flesh, and πενῐᾱ (penía) for loss. The term was first coined by I.H. Rosenberg in 1989. Dysphagia meant difficulty in swallowing and is derived from the Greek words δυσ (hard, difficult) and φαγία (eater).

== Prevalence ==
It is unknown how many people suffer from sarcopenic dysphagia, but there is data on sarcopenia and dysphagia separately. A study in 2025 used 9 different diagnostic criteria for sarcopenia to determine its prevalence in 2077 community-dwelling people aged 65–99 was about 4.8 - 16.1%. In 2004, a questionnaire taken by 1313 community-dwelling people aged 65 and older found a prevalence rate of dysphagia of 13.8%. An online survey in 2024 that included 4000 respondents from four different countries determined that about 37% of the UK respondents, 41% of those in Indonesia, 55% in Brazil and 65% in China reported an Eating Assessment Tool (EAT-10) score of ≥3, which may indicate dysphagia. Compared to these numbers, very few people reported having a formal diagnosis of dysphagia: 2% in the UK and 5% in Brazil.
