= Keeper of the Meaning =

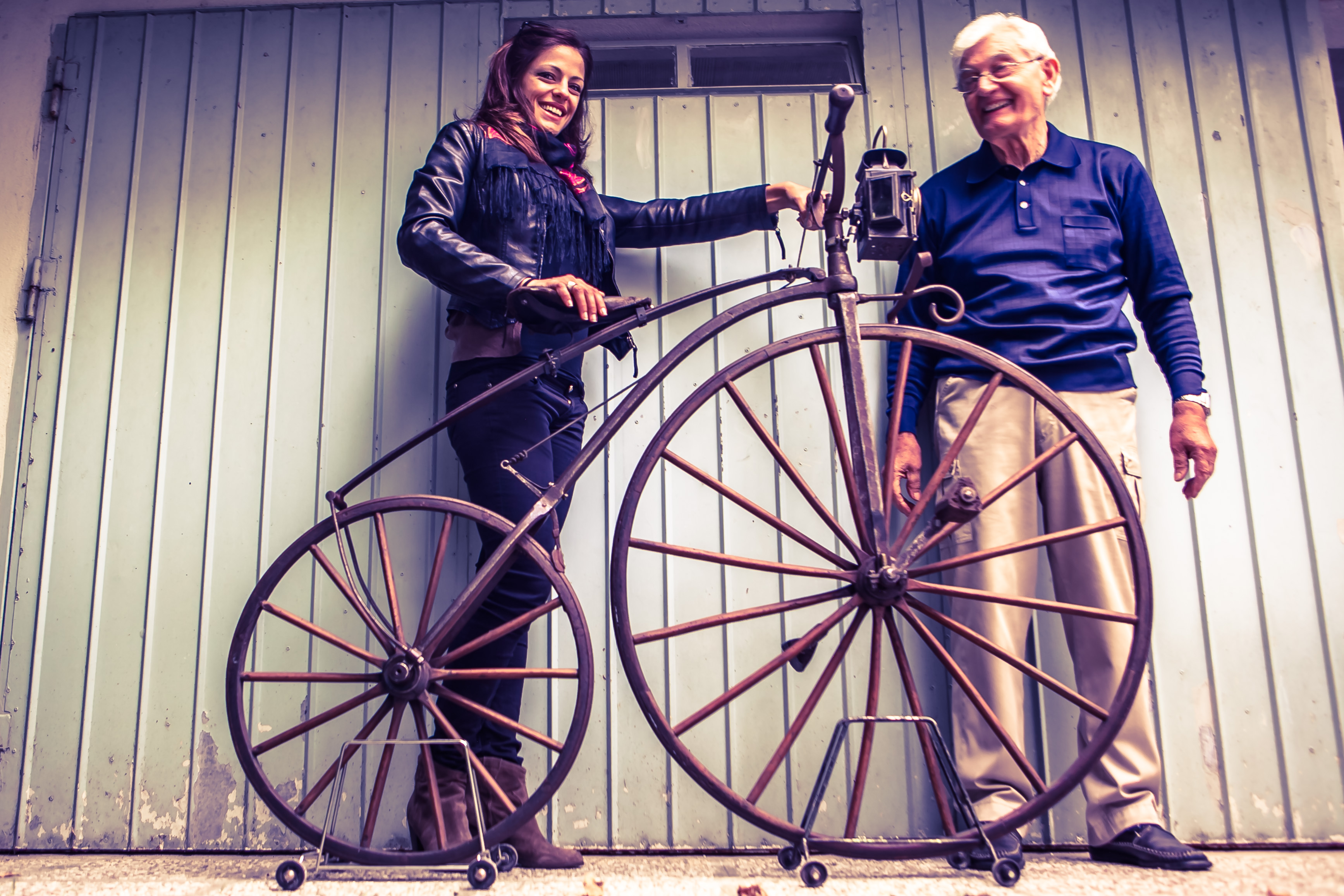
This older adult has a collection of bicycles that he has preserved, reflecting his role as a keeper of the meaning.

Keeper of the Meaning is a stage of adult development which involves the "conservation and preservation of the collective products of mankind". This stage was developed by George Vaillant in 1993 and added to Erikson's stages of psychosocial development, between generativity vs. stagnation and integrity vs. despair. This stage covers the ages of 60 to 75. Vaillant contrasts keeper of the meaning with rigidity.

Vaillant stresses that wisdom is a central part of the keeper of the meaning stage. Where generativity focuses on the care of individuals, keeper of the meaning is less selective and focuses on wisdom and justice.

== See also ==
- George Eman Vaillant
- Erikson's stages of psychosocial development
- Career consolidation
