= TOFI =

Individual with disproportionate amount of fat

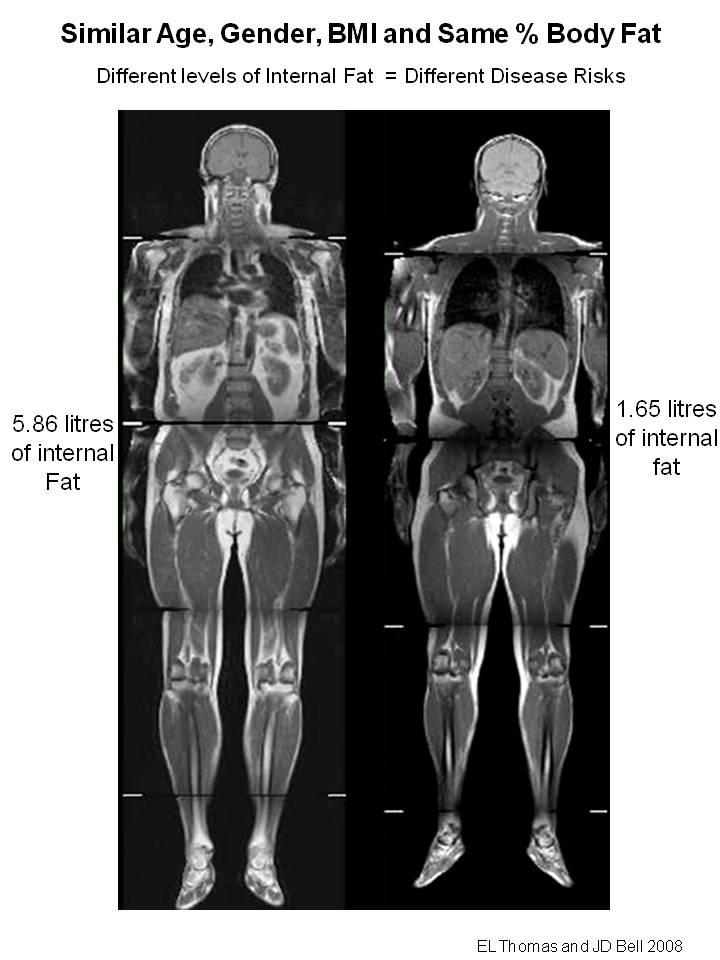
MRI image of a TOFI man and a normal control

TOFI (thin-outside-fat-inside) is used to describe lean individuals with a disproportionate amount of fat (adipose tissue) stored in their abdomen. The figure to illustrate this shows two men, both 35 years old, with a BMI of 25 kg/m^{2}. Despite their similar size, the TOFI had 5.86 litres of internal fat, whilst the healthy control had only 1.65 litres.

Subjects defined as TOFI with body mass index (BMI) <25 kg/m^{2} have increased levels of many of the risk factors associated with the metabolic syndrome. This phenotype is a further refinement of "metabolically-obese normal-weight" (MONW).

Subjects defined as TOFI have been described as being at higher risk of developing insulin resistance and type 2 diabetes due to the fact that they have reduced physical activity/VO_{2}max, reduced insulin sensitivity, higher abdominal adiposity, and a more atherogenic lipid profile. Another important characteristic observed in this cohort is elevated levels of liver fat. It is shown that overconsumption of fructose can lead to TOFI by inducing inflammation associated cortisol release.

== Measurement ==
To classify an individual as TOFI, it is essential to measure their internal fat content. This is done by using magnetic resonance Imaging (MRI) or CT scanning. The parameters of the MRI scanner are manipulated to show fat as bright (white) and lean tissue as dark.

Indirect methods such as waist circumference are not suitable as individuals with an identical waist circumference can have vastly different levels of internal fat.

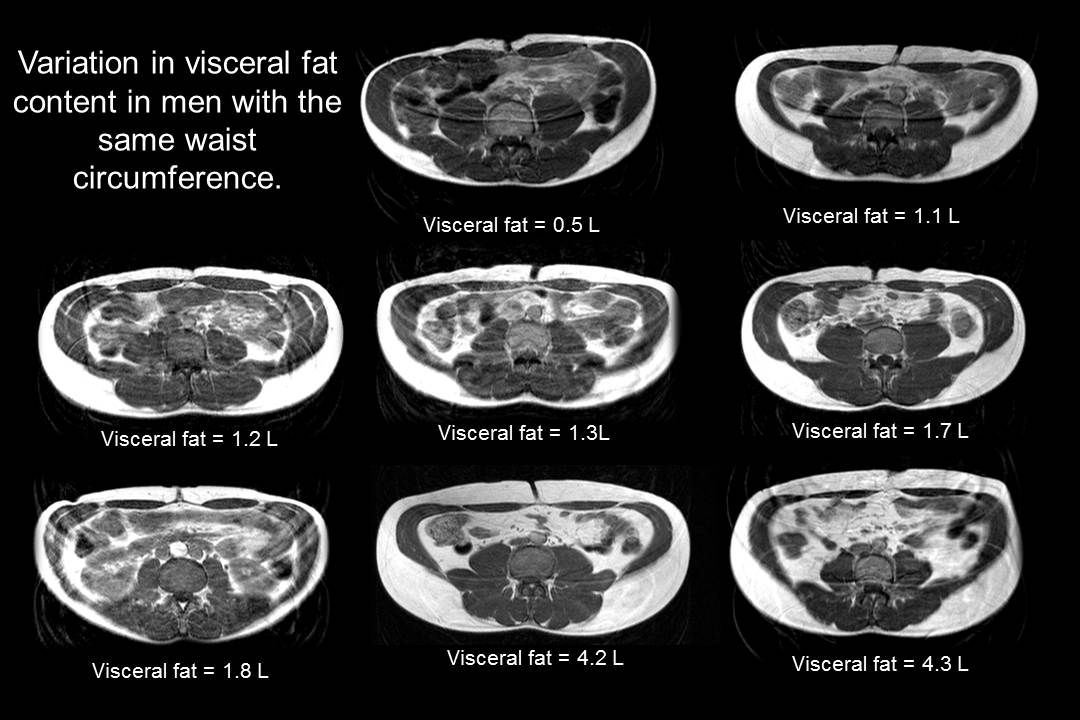
Variation in visceral fat in men with the same waist circumference

The figure clearly shows that despite having an identical waist circumference (in this example all men had a waist of 84 cm), there is considerable variation in the amount of visceral fat (volumes shown on the image in litres) present.

== Epidemiology ==
This is difficult to establish in the general population since the necessary imaging examinations are time-consuming and expensive; however, in a 2012 research study it was estimated that 14% of the men and 12% of the women scanned with a BMI 20–25 kg/m^{2} were classified as TOFI^{[1]}.

== Society and culture ==
Since the first scientific observations that some lean subjects could have as much, if not more, body fat internally than overweight or obese individuals, there has been considerable media and press interest in this area of research. The first article in the popular press appeared in 2006 in The Guardian, followed by many other newspapers and television documentaries.

== See also ==
- Normal weight obesity
- Metabolically healthy obesity
