= Journal of Cachexia, Sarcopenia and Muscle =

- Discipline: Muscle diseases
- Language: English
- Edited by: Stefan D. Anker, Stephan von Haehling

Publication details
- History: 2010–present
- Publisher: Wiley-Blackwell in association with the Society on Sarcopenia, Cachexia and Wasting Disorders
- Frequency: Quarterly
- Open access: Hybrid
- Impact factor: 12.511 (2017)

Standard abbreviations
- ISO 4: J. Cachexia Sarcopenia Muscle

Indexing
- ISSN: 2190-5991 (print); 2190-6009 (web)
- LCCN: 2011243798
- OCLC no.: 724671564

Links
- Journal homepage; Online access; Online archive

The Journal of Cachexia, Sarcopenia and Muscle is a quarterly peer-reviewed medical journal that covers research relevant to changes in body composition, especially cachexia and sarcopenia, as consequences of chronic illnesses or of the aging process, respectively. It was established in 2010 and was originally published by Springer Science+Business Media. As of January 2015, the journal is published by Wiley-Blackwell in association with the Society on Sarcopenia, Cachexia and Wasting Disorders. The founding editors-in-chief are Stefan D. Anker (Charité - Universitätsmedizin Berlin) and Stephan von Haehling (University of Göttingen). As of November 2016, the journal has two daughter journals entitled JCSM - Clinical Reports and JCSM - Rapid Communications, dedicated to clinical and basic science, respectively.

== Abstracting and indexing ==
The journal is abstracted and indexed in Embase, Science Citation Index Expanded, and Scopus. According to the Journal Citation Reports, the journal has a 2017 impact factor of 12.511.
