= Dynapenia =

Loss of muscular strength not caused by neurological or muscular disease

Dynapenia (pronounced dahy-nuh-pē-nē-a, Greek translation for poverty of strength, power, or force) is the loss of muscular strength not caused by neurological or muscular disease that typically is associated with older adults.

Dynapenia is the loss of muscle strength, rather than the loss of muscle mass (sarcopenia). The preservation of muscular strength through the aging process has become increasingly significant with increasing life expectancy in the modern world.

== History ==
The muscular degeneration that occurs throughout the aging process has been one of the greatest concerns of mankind for thousands of years. Greeks of the 4th and 5th centuries BC viewed aging as a chronic, incurable, and progressive disease. By the 1st century BC and 1st century AD, aging began to be thought of as something that is modifiable and should be resisted. In Cicero’s ‘Essay on Old Age’ from 44 BC he states that “it is our duty… to resist old age, to compensate for its defects, to fight against it as we would fight a disease; to adopt a regimen of health; to practice moderate exercise; and to take just enough food and drink to restore our strength.” Cicero also highlights the restrictions aging has forced upon mankind for centuries; restrictions that we are now trying to overcome with today's technology. “Old age,” it seems, “disqualifies us from taking an active part in the great scenes of business. But in what scenes? let me ask. If in those which require the strength and vivacity of youth, I readily admit the charge.” Although aging has always been perceived as a paradox that plagues humanity, the idea of formulating preventative treatments didn't advance until the latter part of the 20th century. With the rapid advancement of today's technology and the unprecedented growth rate of the world's older population, the drive of the scientific community to delay the aging process has significantly increased. “The next imputation thrown upon old age is, that it impairs our strength, and it must be acknowledged the charge is not altogether without foundation. But, for my part, I no more regret the want of that vigour which I possessed in my youth, than I lamented in my youth that I was not endowed with the force of a bull or an elephant. It is sufficient if we exert with spirit, upon every proper occasion, that degree of strength which still remains with us.” The aging process remains an inevitable part of the life cycle, but science is now being used to treat the deterioration of the human body so that the aging population can live with independence and comfort.

== Difference from sarcopenia ==
Sarcopenia is defined as loss of muscle tissue as a natural part of the aging process. This does not include loss of muscle strength, which is defined by dynapenia. Muscle strength appears to be a critical component in maintaining physical function, mobility, and vitality in old age, which is why it's imperative to identify and study contributing factors of dynapenia. A longitudinal study on the age-related changes in muscle strength, quality, and inter muscular fat showed an increase in adipose tissue infiltration of mid thigh skeletal muscle in both men and women ranging between 70 and 79 years-old during a 5-year period. The increase in fatty tissue infiltration occurred regardless of changes in weight or subcutaneous thigh adipose tissue. The study also found that the decrease in muscle strength due to aging was 2-5 times greater than the loss of muscle size. These results demonstrate the age-related progression of muscle weakness and muscular fat infiltration regardless of changes in muscle mass or subcutaneous fat, reinforcing that muscle quality is lost with aging.

== Signs and symptoms ==
The age-associated deterioration of force-generating properties of skeletal muscles can be directly associated with increased risk of physical disability, functional impairments, and increased mortality. Dynapenia can contribute to increased risk of falling as well as feeling weak and/or fatigued. With regard to the relation of higher levels of muscular strength to a lower risk of premature death, studies by Newman et al. have shown that grip and knee extensor muscle strength are strongly correlated with mortality. For women, they observed crude hazard ratios of 1.84 for grip strength and 1.65 for knee extensor strength. For men, they observed crude hazard ratios of 1.36 for grip strength and 1.51 for knee extensor strength. More recent studies by Xue et al. have observed that faster decline in hip flexor and grip strengths individually predicted mortality after accounting for potential contributors. Manini et al. recently conducted an informal meta-analysis that showed significant correlation between low levels of muscle strength and poor physical performance and/or physical disability in 90% of the studies. Together, these studies provide evidence that dynapenia in older adults is strongly correlated with increased risk of physical disabilities and mortality, and decreased physical function.

== Diagnosis ==
There currently is no agreed upon algorithm to diagnose dynapenia. Lack of consensus upon how to properly diagnose the disease has prevented practitioners from determining if muscle weakness likely plays a role in an individual's disability or poor physical performance. Manini and Clark have proposed a decision algorithm for the diagnosis of dynapenia. The algorithm begins by screening individuals aged over 60 years for dynapenia, and those with high risk factors for the development of dynapenia are referred for a knee extension strength assessment. If an individual presents no or low risk factors, it is suggested that they undergo a grip strength test to decide if a lower extremity strength test is needed. Follow-up testing is then recommended based on the results of these tests to determine the etiology of dynapenia. It's important to note that dynapenia is defined based on muscle strength rather than muscle power because both factors perform similarly when identifying individuals with physical disability or poor physical performance. A recent study from Bean and colleagues showed that older adults with mobility limitations who participated in a 16-week “power-training” exercise program were able to raise their leg press power about 10% more than the group that participated in a traditional “strength-training” exercise program. Both groups exhibited equivalent increases in muscle strength and mobility performance, despite the 10% difference in muscle power. Also, there is a limited amount of data on muscle power from epidemiological studies of aging. The equipment to measure muscle strength is also more readily available than equipment used to measure muscle power. Together, these factors justify the reasoning behind using muscle strength to define dynapenia rather than muscle power.

== Risk factors ==
Three principal risk factors stand out when considering preemptive components of dynapenia.

1. Low Physical Activity- Physical activity in adults aged 65 years and above typically includes everyday activities such as household chores, walking, gardening, occupational, or planned exercise such as swimming or dancing. It is recommended by the World Health Organization that older adults participate in at least 150 minutes of moderate-intensity aerobic activity or at least 75 minutes of vigorous aerobic activity throughout the week.
2. Reported Weakness- Unintentional weight loss, muscle weakness measured by reduced grip strength, physical slowness, and poor endurance are all symptoms of muscle weakness that put individuals at a high risk of dynapenia.
3. Age >80 years – Several studies have shown that aging impairs central isometric activation. A study by Harridge and colleagues concluded that very old adults (age 85–97 years) had significant impairments in central activation (mean: 81%; range: 69–93%). Another study by Stevens and colleagues combined previously collected data on the impact of aging on knee extensor central activation and found that central activation in older adults was much less than that of young adults (87% vs 98% activation).

== Causes ==
=== Biological ===
Possible biological contributors to dynapenia include the nervous system’s deteriorating control of voluntary skeletal muscle activation and a decreased number of functioning motor units. The nervous system's lowered ability to stimulate a full muscle contraction subsequently leads to loss of muscle strength and power. A study by Harridge et al. also showed that all dynapenic subjects had incomplete voluntary activation during a maximum contraction (69-93%), suggesting that loss of voluntary muscle activation plays an important role in the loss of muscle strength. Studies involving the dissection of cadavers have uncovered a 43% decrease in the cell body size of neurons found in the premotor cortex compared to those of younger adults. New studies have recently verified this finding in living subjects using high resolution magnetic resonance imaging (MRI).

Recent evidence suggests that aging is also related to the loss of myelinated nerve fiber length and the mass of white matter, with individuals losing approximately 45% of total nerve fiber length as they age. These changes that develop through the aging process affect the connectivity of the cortex within itself as well as its connectivity to the rest of the central nervous system.

Another potential contributor to dynapenia is a disruption of the process that converts electrical signal given for muscular activation into an actual contraction. Particularly, impairments in the release of calcium (Ca2+) from the sarcoplasmic reticulum have been suggested to explain why decreased muscle quality is so prevalent in older adults.

A systematic review on the literature regarding the relationship between type II muscle fiber loss and aging found that the total number of fibers in the vastus lateralis decreases tremendously with age. This decline is first observed around 25 years of age and proceeds at an even greater rate throughout the lifespan. The age-related Type II fiber loss highlights the negative effect of aging on muscle power.

=== Nutritional ===
It has also been suggested that nutritional factors may contribute to the onset of dynapenia. It has been proposed that low levels of Vitamin E, carotenoids, and selenium are associated with lower levels of muscle strength. The activity of Vitamin D receptors on muscle has been found to decrease with aging. These receptors initiate the nuclear response leading to de novo synthesis of proteins. However, the results of multiple studies on the relation between Vitamin D and muscle strength have been highly controversial, making the effect of Vitamin D on muscle strength in need of further investigation. The Recommended Dietary Allowance (RDA) for protein is not very clear for older adults; it may underestimate the amount of protein needed to maintain optimal physical function with age. A study by Houston and colleagues showed how decreased protein intake may increase the risk of developing mobility limitations later on. The study revealed that 35.4% out of 43% of participants who consumed a significantly smaller amount of protein (mean: 0.38 g/kg body weight/d) than the RDA (0.8 g/kg body weight/d) developed mobility limitations over the 6 year follow-up. In contrast, participants who consumed more protein (mean: (≥1.0 g/kg body weight/d) than the RDA had a lower risk of developing mobility limitations over the 6 year follow-up.

== Prevention ==
Resistance training has been shown to greatly influence virtually all of the strength related physiological mechanisms of the nervous and skeletal muscle systems - even into very late life. Recent studies by Peterson et al. have uncovered two critical aspects of resistance training that must be implemented in the training process to achieve positive results. One factor is the positive correlation between higher intensity resistance training and greater improvements in muscle strength. The other factor is a direct relationship between increased resistance training volume, which is the total number of exercise sets performed in a session, and improvements in lean body mass. A meta-analysis on the effect of resistance exercise for multiple strength outcomes in older adults revealed a positive effect for each of the strength outcomes. Specifically, the estimate of mean strength change from baseline to post intervention for the leg press was 31.63 kg. There was a mean strength change of 9.83 kg for the chest press, 12.08 kg for the knee extension, and 10.63 kg for the lat pull. These results demonstrate that resistance training is an effective way to improve the muscular strength capacity of older adults.

== Research ==
By defining strength cutoff values and establishing a clinical definition of dynapenia, treatment and prevention plans could be developed to decrease the physical limitations of older adults. The creation of an agreed-upon definition of dynapenia could give clinicians the ability to diagnose patients with decreased muscle function and expand research on the subject by providing a universal standard, which in turn could lead to the development of effective interventions and treatment options. Gathering a firmer understanding of what causes dynapenia will help determine the degree of variance in the biological contributions of participants, and provide insight into how treatment options may be adapted to fit patients’ unique needs.
