= Adult development =

Human development following adolescence

Adult development refers to the changes that occur in biological and psychological domains of human life from the end of adolescence until the end of one's life.

Changes that occur at the cellular level are partially explained by biological theories of adult development and aging. Biological changes often influence psychological and interpersonal/social developmental changes, which can be described by stage theories of human development. Stage theories typically focus on "age-appropriate" developmental tasks to be achieved at each stage. Erik Erikson and Carl Jung proposed stage theories of human development that encompass the entire life span, and emphasized the potential for positive change very late in life.

The concept of adulthood has legal and socio-cultural definitions. The legal definition of an adult is a person who is fully grown or developed. This is referred to as the age of majority, which is age 18 in most cultures, although there is a variation from 15 to 21. Middle-aged adulthood starts at about age 40, followed by old age/late adulthood around age 65. The socio-cultural definition of being an adult is based on what a culture normatively views as being the required criteria for adulthood, which in turn, influences the lives of individuals within that culture. This may or may not coincide with the legal definition. Current views on adult development in late life focus on the concept of successful aging, defined as "...low probability of disease and disease-related disability, high cognitive and physical functional capacity, and active engagement with life."

Biomedical theories hold that one can age successfully by caring for physical health and minimizing loss in function, whereas psychosocial theories posit that capitalizing upon social and cognitive resources, such as a positive attitude or social support from neighbors, family, and friends, is key to aging successfully.

== Contemporary and classic theories ==
Adult development is a somewhat new area of study in the field of psychology. Previously it was assumed that development would cease at the end of adolescence. Further research has concluded that development continues well after adolescence and into late adulthood. Stress can affect learning and memory in adults by changing brain structure and function.This new field of research was influenced by the aging population of the "baby boomer" generation. The population of Americans who are the age of 65 or over was at roughly 9 million in 1940. In just 60 years that total has grown to over 35 million people. This rise in population and life expectancy had shined a light on the manifestation of development throughout adulthood. Changes in adulthood have been described by several theories and metatheories, which serve as a framework for adult development research. One of which is Erik Erikson who went beyond childhood stages and introduced the concept of continuing development until death.

=== Lifespan development theory ===
Life span development can be defined as age-relating experiences that occur from birth to the entirety of a human's life. The theory considers the lifelong accumulation of developmental additions and subtractions, with the relative proportion of gains to losses diminishing over an individual's lifetime. According to this theory, life span development has multiple trajectories (positive, negative, stable) and causes (biological, psychological, social, and cultural). Individual variation is a hallmark of this theory – not all individuals develop and age at the same rate and in the same manner.

==== Bronfenbrenner's ecological theory ====
Urie Bronfenbrenner's ecological theory is an environmental system theory and social ecological model which focuses on five environmental systems:

- Microsystem: This system is the immediate environment of an individual. It includes relationships and interactions that are closest to the individual, therefore, having a very significant and direct impact. Structures in the microsystem may include family, school, peers, or work environments.
- Mesosystem: This system portrays the connections and interactions between an individual's microsystem structures. This could be demonstrated by the relationship between an individual's family and school.
- Exosystem: This system contains structures that an individual does not directly interact with and is not directly impacted by; rather, the structures indirectly affect the individual through one of their microsystems. If the individual was a child their exosystem may include elements such as the legal services, their parents' work, or the school board. These elements do not directly impact the child, but they may impact some of the child's microsystems (such as their parents/family) which do directly affect the child.
- Macrosystem: This system is considered to be the outermost layer of an individual's environment. It encompasses the culture and society in which a person lives in and is affected by. It includes the values, beliefs, laws, and customs by which a culture/society is dictated. The macrosystem ultimately influences the structures within the other systems and their interactions.
- Chronosystem: This system encompasses the changes that occur throughout time in an individual's life. These changes may entail personal events, such as reaching puberty and the passing of a family member, as well as societal events, such as wars and technological advancements.

==== Jeffrey Arnett's theory of Emerging Adulthood ====
The theory of Emerging Adulthood was developed by Jeffery Arnett in the early 2000s. The theory is centered around changes often experienced during the transition from adolescence to adulthood. This time period takes place usually between the ages of 18 and 29. The concept of emerging adulthood is new, and likely developed due to growing numbers of college attendance and other social, economic, and cultural changes that have delayed typical markers of being an "adult".

There are five main characteristics describing what Emerging Adulthood looks like. To examine these five characteristics, in 1995 Jeffery Arnett interviewed 300 young adults aged 18 to 29 on the topic of what they wanted out of life. Due to this, Jeffery Arnett came up with the five characteristic and they go as follows: The Age Of Identity Exploration, The Age of Instability, The Age of Self Focus, The Age of Feeling in Between, and The Age of Possibilities. The Age Of Identity Exploration is one that Arnett found to be the most prevalent in the young people's lives, due to most people at this stage trying to figure out what they want in life and what their values are in life. The Age of Instability is where one comes into the area of life where everything is going to be changing frequently and some of the things that change dramatically are the status of ones love life and schooling. When one is in this stage of life, they have not yet established themselves, who they want to become, and what their career will look like. Many see this time of life in a negative light but it is where you can obtain the foundation to what you're future will be. The Age of Self Focus is the time where you start to decide who you are and what you want to become. This is where the individual will work a lot harder on themselves and begin to see significant personal growth, and will also become far more independent and self motivated. The Age of Feeling in Between stage is where one is in an area of life when you cannot do everything on your own but are starting to move away from being under the rule of your parents. The Age of Possibilities is the stage where many emerging adults have many different futures ahead of them and a sense of optimism for the different opportunities life has to offer. In addition to, this stage any emerging adults believe that they have the opportunity to have better lives than what their parents had before them. Some emerging adults in America between the ages of 18 and 25 when asked if they were adults, were unable to give a definitive answer of "yes" or "no" but more than likely give the answer that "yes, they have aspects of being an adult but they also have aspects of not being an adult yet." Overall, there is much to the theory of Emerging Adulthood but it still has criticism about its legitimacy. There are some that say that the theory neglects other classes and that this is a flaw. Some of the other things that have been stated about this theory is that it is steered too much to our time period and that this can be viewed as a major flaw and that it also focuses too much on Western culture as well.

=== Erik Erikson's theory of psychosocial development ===
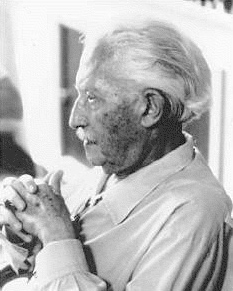
Erik Erikson, psychosocial development theorist

Erik Erikson developed stages of ego development that extended through childhood, adolescence, and adulthood. He was trained in psychoanalysis and was highly influenced by Freud, but unlike Freud, Erikson believed that social interaction is very important to the individual's psychosocial development. His stage theory consists of 8 stages in life from birth to old age, each of which is characterized by a specific developmental task. During each stage, one developmental task is dominant, but may be carried forward into later stages as well. According to Erikson, individuals may experience tension when advancing to new stages of development, and seek to establish equilibrium within each stage. This tension is often referred to as a "crisis," a psycho-social conflict, in which an individual experiences conflict between their inner and outer worlds that are relative to whichever stage they are in. If equilibrium is not found for each task there are potential negative outcomes called maladaptations (abnormally positive) and malignancies (abnormally negative), where malignancy is worse of the two. It posits eight sequential stages of individual human development influenced by biological, psychological, and social factors throughout the lifespan. This bio-psychosocial approach has influenced several fields of study, including gerontology, personality development, identity formation, life cycle development, and more.

- Stage 1 – Trust vs. Mistrust (0 to 1.5 years)

Trust vs. Mistrust is experienced in the first years of life. Trust in infancy helps the child be secure about the world around them. Because an infant is completely dependent, they start building trust based on the dependability and quality of their caregivers. If a child successfully develops trust, he or she will feel safe and secure.

Maladaptation – sensory distortion (e.g. unrealistic, spoilt, deluded)

Malignancy – withdrawal (e.g. neurotic, depressive, afraid)

- Stage 2 – Autonomy vs. Shame and Doubt (1.5 – 3 years)

After gaining trust in their caregivers, infants learn that they are responsible for their actions. They begin to make judgments and move on their own. When toddlers are punished too severely or too often, they are likely to experience shame and self-doubt.

Maladaptation – impulsivity (e.g. reckless, inconsiderate, thoughtless)

Malignancy – compulsion (e.g. anal, constrained, self-limiting)

- Stage 3 – Initiative vs. Guilt (3 – 6 years)

During preschool years children start to use their power and control over the world through playing and other social interactions. Children who successfully pass this stage feel capable and able to lead others, while those who do not are left with a sense of guilt, self-doubt, and lack of initiative.

Maladaptation – ruthlessness (e.g. exploitative, uncaring, dispassionate)

Malignancy – inhibition (e.g. risk-averse, unadventurous)

- Stage 4 – Industry vs. Inferiority (6 years to puberty)

When children interact with others they start to develop a sense of pride in their abilities and accomplishments. When parents, teachers, or peers command and encourage kids, they begin to feel confident in their skills. Successfully completing this stage leads to a strong belief in one's ability to handle tasks set in front of them.

Maladaptation – narrow virtuosity (e.g. workaholic, obsessive, specialist)

Malignancy – inertia (e.g. lazy, apathetic, purposeless)

- Stage 5 – Identity vs. Role Confusion (adolescence)

During adolescent years, children begin to find out who they are. They explore their independence and develop a sense of self. This is Erikson's fifth stage, Identity vs Confusion. Completing this stage leads to fidelity, an ability that Erikson described as useful to live by society's standards and expectations.

Maladaptation – fanaticism (e.g. self-important, extremist)

Malignancy – repudiation (e.g. socially disconnected, cut-off)

- Stage 6 – Intimacy vs. Isolation (early adulthood)

In early adulthood, individuals begin to experience intimate relationships in which they must either commit to relating and connecting to others on a personal level or retreat into isolation, afraid of commitment or vulnerability. Being intimate with someone does not always mean having a sexual component; in a platonic relationship, closeness might take the form of self-disclosure. After reaching this stage, a person is equipped to build strong, enduring relationships with other people. According to psychologist Robert Sternberg's "Triangular Theory of Love," companionate love is founded on deep affection, trust, and commitment and develops over time and becomes more prominent in long-term partnerships. In contrast, passionate love is characterized by intense feelings, physical attraction, and excitement and is usually present at the beginning of a relationship. Both types of love are thought to be distinct types that can coexist within a relationship.

Maladaptation – promiscuity (e.g. sexually needy, vulnerable)

Malignancy – exclusivity (e.g. loner, cold, self-contained)

- Stage 7 – Generativity vs. Stagnation (middle adulthood)

This stage usually begins when an individual has established a career and has a family. In this stage, an individual must either contribute significantly to their careers, families and communities in order to ensure success in the next generation or they stagnate, creating a threat to their well-being which can be referred to as a "mid-life crisis." When individuals feel they have successfully fostered growth in themselves and their relationships, they will feel satisfied in their successes and contributions to the world.

Maladaptation – overextension (e.g. do-gooder, busy-body, meddling)

Malignancy – rejectivity (e.g. disinterested, cynical)

- Stage 8 – Integrity vs. Despair (late adulthood)

This stage often occurs when an older individual is in retirement and expecting the end of their life. They reflect on their life and either come to the conclusion that they have found meaning and peace, or their lives were not fulfilling, and they didn't achieve what they wanted to. The former is self-accepting of who they've become, while the latter is not accepting of themselves or their circumstances in life, which leads to despair.

Maladaptation – presumption (e.g. conceited, pompous, arrogant)

Malignancy – disdain (e.g. miserable, unfulfilled, blaming)

=== Michael Commons's theory ===
Michael Commons's Model of Hierarchical Complexity (MHC) is an enhancement and simplification of Bärbel Inhelder and Jean Piaget's developmental model. It offers a standard method of examining the universal pattern of development. This model of hierarchical complexity explains development in stages that are not connected to a person's age, but on the ability of the person to complete increasingly complex hierarchical tasks. For one task to be more hierarchically complex than another, the new task must meet three requirements: 1) It must be defined in terms of the lower stage actions; 2) it must coordinate the lower stage actions; 3) it must do so in a non-arbitrary way. The following are the Common's 15 stages of development which demonstrate the increasingly complex nature of development.

- 0 Calculatory- exact computations only, no generalizations are made
- 1 Sensory and motor- organisms respond to a single stimulus in a reflexive way
- 2 Circular sensory-motor- basic movements like turning head, moving limbs, view objects and movements
- 3 Sensory-motor- form concepts, respond to stimuli in a class
- 4 Nominal- make connections between concepts
- 5 Sentential- imitate and acquire sequences, follow commands and short sequential acts
- 6 Preoperational- make simple deductions, follow longer lists of sequential acts, tell stories
- 7 Primary- apply simple logical rules, able to perform simple arithmetic
- 8 Concrete- able to do complex arithmetic, plan deals
- 9 Abstract- discriminate variables and stereotypes, make propositions
- 10 Formal- argue using linear, one dimensional logic
- 11 Systematic- construct multivariate systems and matrices
- 12 Metasystematic- combine or compare systems to make multi-systems
- 13 Paradigmatic- put metasystems together to create paradigms
- 14 Cross-paradigmatic- put paradigms together to form fields
- 15 Meta-Cross-paradigmatic- reflect on the cross-paradigmatic implications and limitations

=== Carl Jung's theory ===
Carl Jung, a Swiss psychoanalyst, formulated four stages of development and believed that development was a function of reconciling opposing forces.

- Childhood: (birth to puberty) Childhood has two substages. The archaic stage is characterized by sporadic consciousness, while the monarchic stage represents the beginning of logical and abstract thinking. The ego starts to develop." Jung believed that consciousness is formed in a child starting when a child can say the word "I". And through that, the more a child distinguish him/herself from others and the world, the more ego develops. According to Jung, the psyche assumes a definite content not until puberty. That is when a teenager struggles through difficulties; he/she also begins to fantasize."
- Youth: (Age 15-39) Maturing sexuality, growing consciousness, and a realization that the carefree days of childhood are gone forever. People strive to gain independence, find a mate, and raise a family.
- Middle Age: (Age 40-64) The realization that you will not live forever creates tension. If you desperately try to cling to youth, you will fail in the process of self-realization. Jung believed that in midlife, one confronts one's shadow. Religiosity may increase during this period, according to Jung.
- Old Age: (Age 65 and over) Consciousness is reduced. Jung thought that death is the ultimate goal of life. By realizing this, people will not face death with fear, but with a hope for rebirth.

=== Daniel Levinson's theory ===
Daniel Levinson's theory, influenced by Erikson's theory of development, explain a set of psychosocial 'seasons' through which adults must pass as they move through early adulthood and midlife. Each of these seasons is characterized by a crisis to overcome. Stages are created by the challenges of building or maintaining a life structure and by the social norms that apply to particular age groups, particularly concerning relationships and career. Levinson also emphasized that a common part of adult development is the midlife crisis. The process that underlies all these stages is individuation - a movement towards balance and wholeness over time. The key stages that he discerned in early adulthood and midlife were as follows:

- Early Adult Transition (Ages 16–24)
- Forming a Life Structure (Ages 24–28)
- Settling down (Ages 29–34)
- Becoming One's Own Man (Ages 35–40)
- Midlife Transition (The early forties)
- Restabilization, into Late Adulthood (Age 45 and on)

Levinson's work includes research on differences in the lives of men and women. He published The Seasons of a Man's Life and The Seasons of a Woman's Life, with findings that men and women went through essentially the same crises but differed in "The Dream." The author wrote that men's dreams are centered around occupations and women's are conflicted between occupation and marriage and family.

=== A biopsychosocial metatheory of adult development ===
The 'biopsychosocial' approach to adult development states that to understand human development in its fullness, biological, psychological, and social levels of analysis must be included. There are a variety of biopsychosocial meta-models, but all entail a commitment to the following four premises:

1. Human development happens concurrently at biological, psychological, and social levels throughout life, and a full descriptive account of development must include all three levels.
2. Development at each of these three levels reciprocally influences the other two levels; therefore nature (biology) and nurture (social environment) are in constant complex interaction when considering how and why psychological development occurs.
3. Biological, psychological and social descriptions, and explanations are all as valid as each other, and no level has causal primacy over the other two.
4. Any aspect of human development is best described and explained in relation to the whole person and their social context, as well as to their biological and cognitive-affective parts. This can be called a holistic or contextualist viewpoint, and can be contrasted with the reductionist approach to development, which tends to focus solely on biological or mechanistic explanations.

=== Robert Kegan's theory ===
Robert Kegan is an American developmental psychologist as well as the author or co-author of books such as In Over Our Heads, The Evolving Self, How the Way We Talk Can Change the Way We Work, and An Everyone Culture: Becoming a Deliberately Developmental Organization among other works. Kegan was also a professor at Harvard Graduate School of Education.

In The Evolving Self, Kegan explores human life problems through meaning-making, the process of making sense of experience by discovering problems and resolving problems. This book assists professional helpers with ways to understand how their clients make sense of their problems. Kegan proposes a framework of six evolutionary balances (developmental stages) that each have a culture of embeddedness. The culture of embeddedness can be examined in terms of three functions in development: confirmation (holding on), contradiction (letting go), and continuity (staying put). In this book, Kegan describes the process of emergence for the six evolutionary balances. These evolutionary balances have analogues to theories from Piaget, Kohlberg, Loevinger, Maslow, McClelland/Murray, and Erikson. In Over Our Heads further elaborates Kegan's perspective on adult development.

The book How the Way We Talk Can Change the Way We Work presents a practical method called the "immunity map" to help people overcome an immunity to change, an obstacle to further psychological development. The map is made of a four-column worksheet that guides a process of self-reflective inquiry.

The book An Everyone Culture: Becoming a Deliberately Developmental Organization Kegan and colleagues connect the concept of deliberately developmental organizations (DDOs) with adult development theories and argues for the importance of transitioning from a socialized mind to a self-authoring mind and then from a self-authoring mind to a self-transforming mind.

== Normative physical changes in adulthood ==
Physical development in midlife and beyond include changes at the biological level (senescence) and larger organ and musculoskeletal levels. Sensory changes and degeneration begin to be common in midlife. Degeneration can include the breakdown of muscle, bones, and joints. Which leads to physical ailments such as sarcopenia or arthritis.

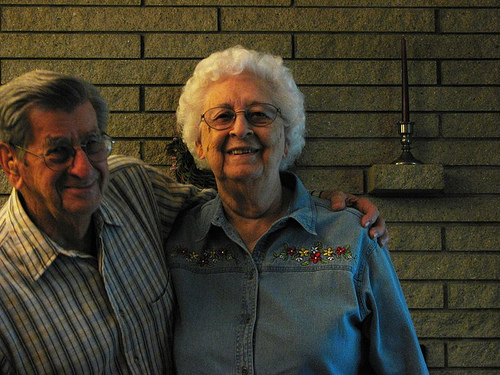
An elderly couple exhibiting typical signs of physical aging

At the sensory level, changes occur to vision, hearing, taste, touch, and smell. Two common sensory changes that begin in midlife include our ability to see close objects and our ability to hear high pitches. Other developmental changes to vision might include cataracts, glaucoma, and the loss of central visual field with macular degeneration. Hearing also becomes impaired in midlife and aging adults, particularly in men. In the past 30 years, hearing impairment has doubled. Hearing aids as an aid for hearing loss still leave many individuals dissatisfied with their quality of hearing. Changes in olfaction and sense of taste can co-occur. "Olfactory dysfunction can impair quality of life and may be a marker for other deficits and illnesses" and can also lead to decreased satisfaction in taste when eating. Losses to the sense of touch are usually noticed when there is a decline in the ability to detect a vibratory stimulus. The loss of sense of touch can harm a person's fine motor skills such as writing and using utensils. The ability to feel painful stimuli is usually preserved in aging, but the process of decline for touch is accelerated in those with diabetes.

Physical deterioration to the body begins to increase in midlife and late life, and includes degeneration of muscle, bones, and joints. Sarcopenia, a normal developmental change, is the degeneration of muscle mass, which includes both strength and quality. This change occurs even in those who consider themselves athletes, and is accelerated by physical inactivity. Many of the contributing factors that may cause sarcopenia to include neuronal and hormonal changes, inadequate nutrition, and physical inactivity. Apoptosis has also been suggested as an underlying mechanism in the progression of sarcopenia. The prevalence of sarcopenia increases as people age and is associated with the increased likelihood of disability and restricted independence among elderly people. Approaches to preventing and treating sarcopenia are being explored by researchers. A specific preventive approach includes progressive resistance training, which is safe and effective for the elderly.

Developmental changes to various organs and organ systems occur throughout life. These changes affect responses to stress and illness, and can compromise the body's ability to cope with the demand for organs. The altered functioning of the heart, lungs, and even skin in old age can be attributed to factors like cell death or endocrine hormones. There are changes to the reproductive system in midlife adults, most notably menopause for women, the permanent end of fertility. In men, hormonal changes also affect their reproductive and sexual physiology, but these changes are not as extreme as those experienced by women.

=== Illnesses associated with aging ===
As adult bodies undergo a variety of physical changes that cause health to decline, a higher risk of contracting a variety of illnesses, both physical and mental, is possible.

- Cancer

Scientists have made a distinctive connection between aging and cancer. It has been shown that the majority of cancer cases occur in those over 50 years of age. This may be due to the decline in the strength of the immune system as one ages or to co-existing conditions. There a variety of symptoms associated with cancer, commonly growths or tumors may be indicators of cancer. Radiation, chemotherapy, and in some cases, surgery, is used to treat cancer.

- The following are the most common types of cancer in the elderly:
  - Breast Cancer
    - Breast cancer is the second most common cancer among women, with a five-year survival rate of 93.2%. The incidence of breast cancer in Korea was 24.2% in 2018. The number of breast cancer survivors has been consistently increasing [[ 1]]. Whereas breast cancer commonly affects those aged 50 years or older in the United States and Europe, it has the highest incidence among those in their 40s in Korea. The earlier onset of breast cancer means a longer period lived as a breast cancer survivor.
  - Prostate Cancer
    - Prostate cancer (PCa) is the second most frequent cancer diagnosed in men worldwide, only behind lung cancer. In 2020, over 1,414,259 new PCa cases and 375,304 deaths were estimated for PCa worldwide.
  - Lung Cancer
    - Lung cancer is the second most common cancer in both men and women (not counting skin cancer). Lung cancer is the leading cause of death from cancer making up almost 25% of all cancer deaths. Mortality from lung cancer is high due to its frequent presentation at a late stage. According to the 2020 statistics by the American Cancer Society, 228,820 new lung cancer cases will be diagnosed in 2020 and there will be 135,720 deaths due to lung cancer in USA. Each year more people die of lung cancer than of colon, breast and prostate cancers combined.
  - Bowel Cancer
    - Bowel cancer is a general term for cancer that begins in the large bowel. Depending on where the cancer starts, bowel cancer is sometimes called colon or rectal cancer. Bowel cancer is one of the most common types of cancer diagnosed in the UK. Most people diagnosed with it are over the age of 60.
- Arthritis

Osteoarthritis is one of the most commonly experienced illnesses in adults as they age. Although there are a variety of types of arthritis they all include very similar symptoms: aching joints, stiff joints, continued joint pain, and problems moving joints.

- Cardiovascular disease

It has been found that older age does increase the risk factor of contracting cardiovascular disease. Hypertension and high cholesterol have also been found to increase the likelihood of acquiring cardiovascular disease, which is also commonly found in older adults. Cardiovascular diseases include a variety of heart conditions that may induce a heart attack or other heart-related problems. Healthy eating, exercise, and avoiding smoking are usually used to prevent cardiovascular disease.

- Immune system

Infection occurs more easily as one ages, as the immune system starts to slow and become less effective. Aging also changes how the immune system reacts to infection, making new infections harder to detect and attack. Essentially, the immune system has a higher chance of being compromised the older one gets.

- Type 2 Diabetes

A chronic illness that effect body processes glucose. It becomes far more prevalent in those over 45. Both type 1 and type 2 diabetes may lead to the following serious illnesses such as; strokes, heart attacks, nerve damage, kidney damage and blindness.

=== Adult neurogenesis and neuroplasticity ===
New neurons are constantly formed from stem cells in parts of the adult brain throughout adulthood, a process called adult neurogenesis. The hippocampus is the area of the brain that is most active in neurogenesis. Research shows that thousands of new neurons are produced in the hippocampus every day. The brain constantly changes and rewires itself throughout adulthood, a process known as neuroplasticity. Evidence suggests that the brain changes in response to diet, exercise, social environment, stress, and toxin intake. These same external factors also influence genetic expression throughout adult life - a phenomenon known as genetic plasticity.

== Non-normative cognitive changes in adulthood ==
Dementia is characterized by persistent, multiple cognitive deficits in the domains including, but not limited to, memory, language, and visuospatial skills and can result from central nervous system dysfunction. Two forms of dementia exist: degenerative and nondegenerative. The progression of nondegenerative dementias, like head trauma and brain infections, can be slowed or halted but degenerative forms of dementia, like Parkinson's disease, Alzheimer's disease, and Huntington's are irreversible and incurable.

=== Alzheimer's disease ===
Alzheimer's disease (AD) was discovered in 1907 by Dr. Alois Alzheimer, a German neuropathologist and psychiatrist. Physiological abnormalities associated with AD include neurofibrillary plaques and tangles. Neuritic plaques, that target the outer regions of the cortex, consist of withering neuronal material from a protein, amyloid-beta. Neurofibrillary tangles, paired helical filaments containing over-phosphorylated tau protein, are located within the nerve cell. Early symptoms of AD include difficulty remembering names and events, while later symptoms include impaired judgment, disorientation, confusion, behavior changes, and difficulty speaking, swallowing, and walking. After initial diagnosis, a person with AD can live, on average, an additional 3 to 10 years with the disease. In 2024, it was estimated that 6.9 million Americans age 65 and older had AD. Environmental factors such as head trauma, high cholesterol, and type 2 diabetes can increase the likelihood of AD.

The impact of Alzheimer's disease research and promising developments in treatments like lecanemab important. Understanding the physiological aspects of the disease, as well as the potential treatments, provide hope.

Recent studies for the drug lecanemab have shown promising results for people who suffer from Alzheimer's disease. The drug has been approved for phase three clinical trials^{[1]}. This medication treats early symptoms of cognitive deterioration in people with Alzheimer's.

=== Huntington's disease ===
Huntington's disease (HD) named after George Huntington is a disorder that is caused by an inherited defect in a single gene on chromosome 4, resulting in a progressive loss of mental faculties and physical control. HD affects personality, leads to involuntary muscle movements, cognitive impairment, and deterioration of the nervous system. Symptoms usually appear between the ages of 30 and 50 but can occur at any age, including adolescence. There is currently no cure for HD and treatments focus on managing symptoms and quality of life. Current estimates claim that 1 in 10,000 Americans have HD, however, 1 in 250,000 are at-risk of inheriting it from a parent. Most individuals with HD live 10 to 20 years after a diagnosis.

=== Parkinson's disease ===
Parkinson's disease (PD) was first described by James Parkinson in 1817. James Parkinson did describe his first findings of Parkinson's disease (PD) in early essays. It typically affects people over the age of 50 and affects about 0.3% of developed populations. PD is related to damaged nerve cells that produce dopamine. Common symptoms experienced by people with PD include trembling of the hands, arms, legs, jaw, or head; rigidity (stiffness in limbs and the midsection); bradykinesia; and postural instability, leading to impaired balance and/or coordination. Other areas such as speech, swallowing, olfaction, and sleep may be affected. No cure for PD is available, but diagnosis and treatment can help relieve symptoms. Treatment options include medications like Carbidopa/Levodopa (L-dopa), that reduce the severity of motor symptoms in patients. Alternative treatment options include non-pharmacological therapy. Surgery (pallidotomy, thalamotomy) is often viewed as the last viable option.

Around 80% of patients that have Parkinson's diseases also experience tremors. The tremor's severity is caused by dopamine levels and other factors. Gait disturbances caused by Parkinson's disease may lead to falls. Non-experts need to be aware of the features of Parkinson's disease and should have a basic understanding of how the condition should be treated between primary and secondary care. Some cases of secondary Parkinsonism have been described as iatrogenic after the use of certain drugs such as phenothiazines and reserpine. The vast majority of Parkinsonism is still of unknown etiology and many hypotheses have been proposed.

== Mental health in adulthood and old age ==
Older adults represent a significant proportion of the population, and this proportion is expected to increase with time. Mental health concerns of older adults are important at treatment and support levels, as well as policy issues. The prevalence of suicide among older adults is higher than in any other age group.

=== Depression ===
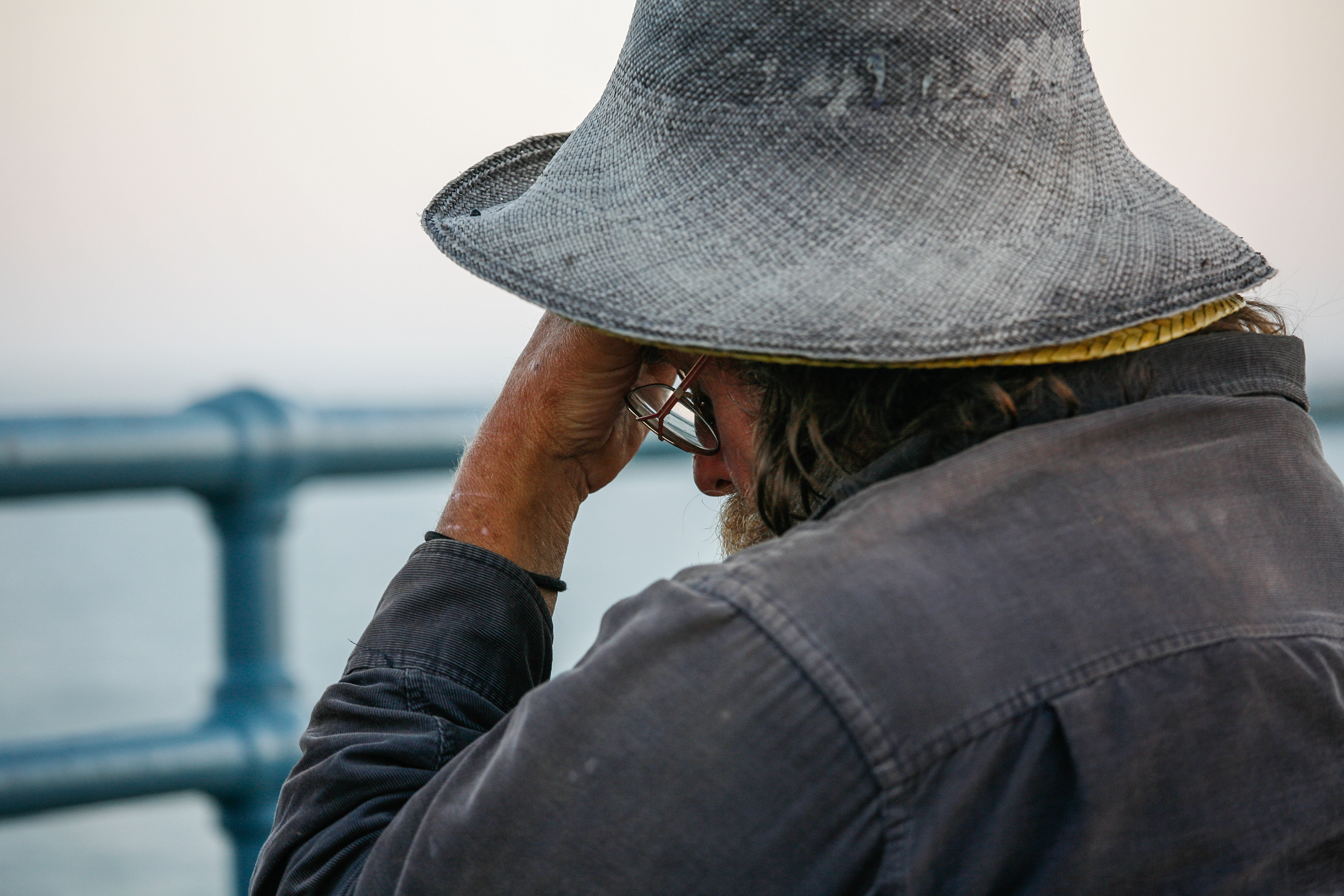
Older adults are often at higher risk for disorders such as depression.

Depression is one of the most common disorders that is present in old age and is usually comorbid with other physical and psychiatric conditions, perhaps due to the stress induced by these conditions. In older adults, depression presents as impairments already associated with age such as memory and psychomotor speed. Research indicates that higher levels of exercise can decrease the likelihood of depression in older adults even after taking into consideration factors such as chronic conditions, body mass index, and social relationships. In addition to exercise, behavioral rehabilitation and prescribed antidepressants, which is well tolerated in older adults, can be used to treat depression. Some research has indicated that a diet rich in folic acid and Vitamin B12 has been tied to preventing the development of depression among older adults.

=== Anxiety ===
Anxiety is a relatively uncommon diagnosis in older adults and it is difficult to determine its prevalence. Anxiety disorders in late life are more likely to be under-diagnosed because of medical comorbidity, cognitive decline, and changes in life circumstances that younger adults do not face. However, in the Epidemiological Catchment Area Project, researchers found that 6-month prevalence rates for anxiety disorders were lowest for the 65 years of age and older cohort. A recent study found that the prevalence of general anxiety disorder (GAD) in adults aged 55 or older in the United States was 33.7% with an onset before the age of 50.

Loneliness in adulthood plays a major factor in depression and anxiety. According to Cacioppo, loneliness is described as a time in one's life when you are emotionally sad and feel as if there is a void in your life for social interactions. Older adults tend to be lonelier due to death of a spouse or children moving away as a result of marriage or careers. Another factor is friends sometimes lose their mobility and cannot socialize like they used to, as socialization plays an important role in protecting people from becoming lonely. Loneliness is categorized in three parts, which are intimate loneliness, relational loneliness and collective loneliness. All three types of loneliness has to do with your personal environment. Older adults sometimes depend on a child, spouse, or friend to be around for them socially for daily interactions and help with everyday chores. Loneliness can be treated by mostly social involvement, such as social skills and social support.

=== Attention deficit hyperactivity disorder (ADHD) ===
ADHD is generally believed to be a children's disorder and is not commonly studied in adults. Research suggests that the overall percentage of adults with ADHD is 4.4%. However, ADHD in adults results in lower household incomes, less educational achievement as well as a higher risk of marital issues and substance abuse. Activities such as driving can be affected; adults with inattentiveness due to ADHD experience increased rates of car accidents. ADHD impairs the driver's ability to drive in such a way that it may resemble intoxicated driving. Adults with ADHD tend to be more creative, vibrant, aware of multiple activities, and are able to multitask when interested in a certain topic.

=== Other mental disorders ===
The impact of mental disorders such as schizophrenia, delusional disorders, paraphrenia, schizoaffective disorder, and bipolar disorder in adulthood is largely mediated by the environmental context. Those in hospitals and nursing homes differ in risk for a multitude of disorders in comparison to community-dwelling older adults. Differences in how these environments treat mental illness and provide social support could help explain disparities and lead to a better knowledge of how these disorders are manifested in adulthood.

== Optimizing health and mental well-being in adulthood ==
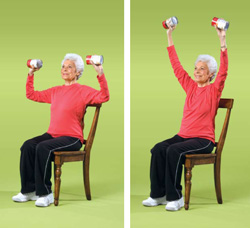
An older adult performing a recommended exercise for aging individuals

Exercising four to six times a week for thirty to sixty minutes has physical and cognitive effects such as lowering blood sugar and increasing neural plasticity. Physical activity reduces the loss of function by 10% each decade after the age of 60 and active individuals drop their rate of decline in half. Cardio activities like walking promote endurance while strength, flexibility, and balance can all be improved through Tai Chi, yoga, and water aerobics. Diets containing foods with calcium, fiber, and potassium are especially important for good health while eliminating foods with high sodium or fat content. A well-balanced diet can increase resistance to disease and improve management of chronic health problems thus making nutrition an important factor for health and well-being in adulthood.

The effects that both aerobic and resistance training can have on the older population can go as far as expanding lifespan. Research has shown that the type of exercise chosen can cause a major difference in results. Resistance training has been found to increase cognitive function not only just in older adults, but in people with intellectual disabilities as well. A high percentage of this population happens to be older adults, but the fact that this exercise makes a difference in other populations as well, shows just how valuable it is. Although it has been shown time and time again that the effects of resistance training on the older adult population are beneficial to cognitive function, these results are not always instant. In some cases, these changes to cognitive function can take years to occur. When referring to results, these results are also not only physical. Resistance training has also been found to play a major role in decreasing depressive mood and isolation from friends. Within the older adult population, Alzheimer's disease is the most found form of dementia that comes with major symptoms. This can lead to interference and decreased ability to perform daily tasks such as going to the grocery store or even standing and sitting. What we do know is that physical activity (especially resistance training) can help improve the overall functionality of this population. This increase in function stems from the positive effects that resistance training has on brain function. Resistance training has also been found to have a positive role in affecting neuron plasticity, neurogenesis, neuron signals, neuron receptors and most neuronal networks.

Cognitive decline, including dementia and Alzheimer's disease, continues to be a health condition that many older adults struggle with. This group of neural diseases tend to inhibit the nervous system's ability to properly send signals for everyday activities, sometimes even killing neurons. Due to nervous tissue's limited regenerative ability, people with cognitive decline are often left with lifelong issues remembering information, judging situations, communicating with others, or thinking in general. The National Institutes of Health (NIH) estimates that 66% of Americans experience some level of cognitive decline in their lifetime. Physical activity has been suggested as a form of preventative medicine to slow cognitive decline; many propose this is due to its positive effects on quality of life, physical, mental, and emotional. A combination of physical changes that come with continuous exercise along with its effect on mental health and emotional connection is the broad focus of many reviews regarding the effectiveness of exercise as preventative medicine and treatment. There are various other proposed explanations, including increasing neuroplasticity and neurogenesis, secretion of neural tissue-protecting substances, and improved cardiovascular fitness. For example, a research team in Japan conducted studies in mice that compared physically active to physically inactive mice. They found that physically active mice had higher circulating irisin, a peptide made in contacting muscles that has a role in neurogenesis and other cognition factors. Most studies and literature reviews similarly conclude that moderate-intensity exercise with long-term adherence will yield the best results for retaining cognitive function in older adults. There are researchers who argue that the association is not as strong as we thought due to low long-term follow up studies, but future research can be done to understand all the factors between cognitive decline and physical activity. A large collection of clinical trial results showed that many studies didn't follow participants after 10 years and there was less of a dose-response relationship between reducing cognitive decline symptoms with the use of consistent exercise. Overall, consistent moderate-intensity exercise should be a significant part of the lives of older adults in order to prevent and treat cognitive decline.

While there is a certain level of individualism at play, there are three articles that show how aging in a healthy way, physically and mentally, can be achieved by focusing on cognitive health, muscle retention, and curbing the effects of neurodegenerative disease. The first article I found explains how consistent exercise and boost the cognitive function of older adults, with proven immediate and long-term benefits. The article also touches on the physical limitations that can come with attempting to achieve these benefits, including things like depression and/or social isolation. It continues by arguing that physical activity can help preserve cognitive health. The second article focuses mainly on whey protein supplementation and how it supports muscle retention while aging. Although the main focus is physical muscle health, similar to the first article, it includes cognitive assessments that gauge cognition throughout the study. These assessments included things like tests for reaction time and working memory, but the main conclusions this article drew, which is a difference I noticed compared to the other two articles) is that it focused more on physical muscle health with whey protein supplementation rather than how it impacts cognitive function, preserves cognition, or prevents any cognitive disorders. The last article I researched looks explicitly at Alzheimer's disease and how physical activity and exercise may slow its progression. Unlike the second article, but similar to the first, the third article explores the process of mitophagy - removal of damaged mitochondria - and how it may inhibit the progression of this neurodegenerative disease. In short, it explains how exercise could theoretically reduce oxidative stress, which in turn supports a healthy brain and slowing the progression of Alzheimer's. The central notions of the first and third articles are pretty similar, and the methods of the second article (specifically the assessments for cognitive function) all brought supportive evidence and concepts pointing to the idea that physical activity and exercise help maintain cognitive function in older adults and potentially can curb the effects of neurodegenerative disease.

Mental stimulation and optimism are vital to health and well-being in late adulthood. Adults who participate in intellectually stimulating activities every day are more likely to maintain their cognitive faculties and are less likely to show a decline in memory abilities. Mental exercise activities such as crossword puzzles, spatial reasoning tasks, and other mentally stimulating activities can help adults increase their brain fitness. Additionally, researchers have found that optimism, community engagement, physical activity, and emotional support can help older adults maintain their resiliency as they continue through their life span.

=== Managing stress and developing coping strategies ===
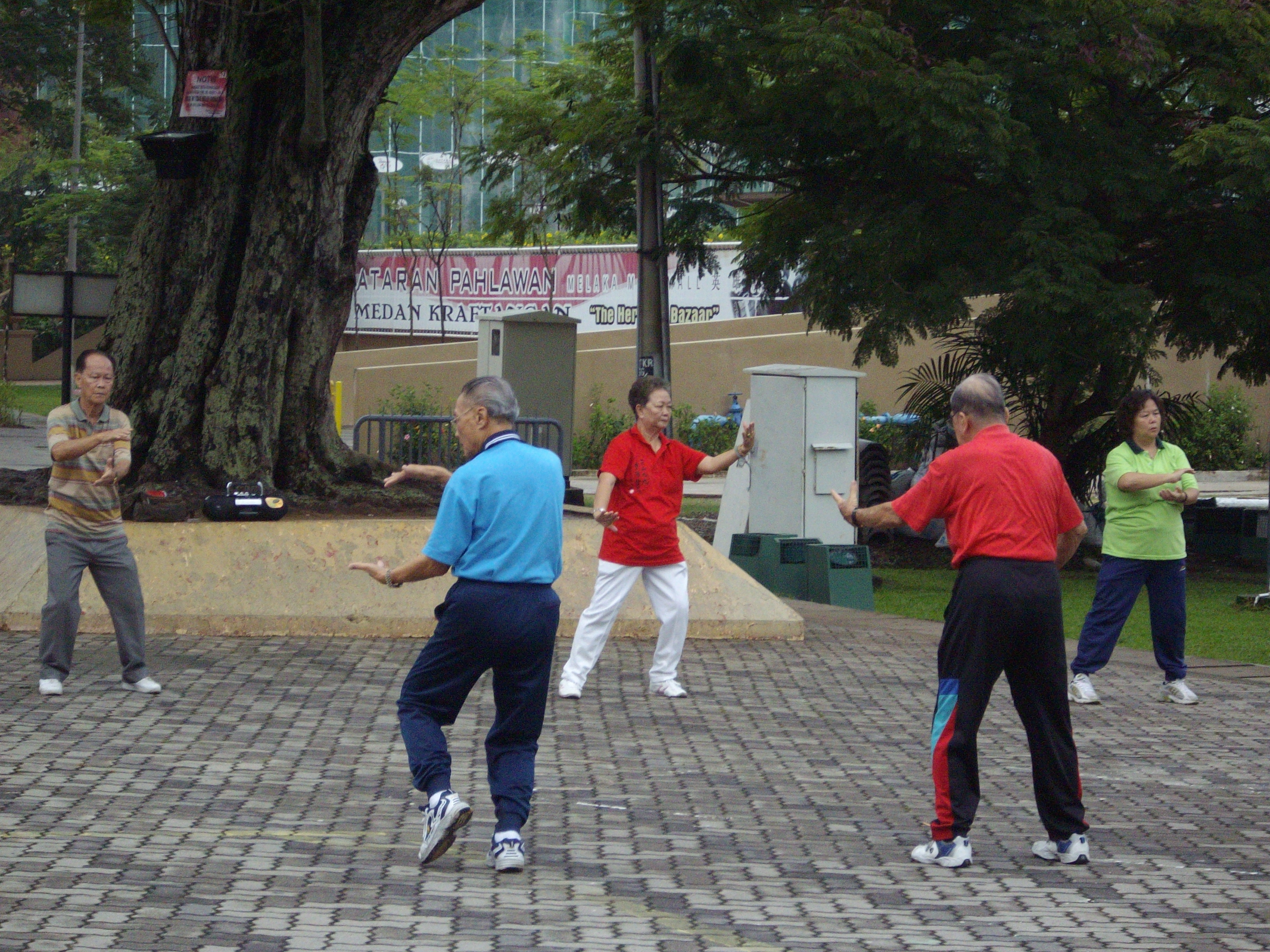
Older adults doing Tai Chi

Cognitive, physical, and social losses, as well as gains, are to be expected throughout the lifespan. Older adults typically self-report having a higher sense of well-being than their younger counterparts because of their emotional self-regulation. Researchers use Selective Optimization with Compensation Theory to explain how adults compensate for changes to their mental and physical abilities, as well as their social realities. Older adults can use both internal and external resources to help cope with these changes.

The loss of loved ones and ensuing grief and bereavement are inevitable parts of life. Positive coping strategies are used when faced with emotional crises, as well as when coping with everyday mental and physical losses. Adult development comes with both gains and losses, and it is important to be aware and plan ahead for these changes in order to age successfully.

== Personality in adulthood ==
Personality change and stability occur in adulthood. For example, self-confidence, warmth, self-control, and emotional stability increase with age, whereas neuroticism and openness to experience tend to decline with age. As people grow older, they experience not only physical changes but psychological ones that can change throughout one's lifespan.

=== Personality change in adulthood ===
Two types of statistics are used to classify personality change over the life span. Rank-order change refers to a change in an individual's personality trait relative to other individuals. Mean-level change refers to absolute change in the individual's level of a certain trait over time. Typically, it appears that as individuals' age they show increased self-confidence, warmth, self-control, and emotional stability. These changes seem to mostly take place between the ages of 20 and 40.

=== Controversy ===
The plaster hypothesis refers to personality traits tending to stabilize by age 30. Stability in personality throughout adulthood has been observed in longitudinal and sequential research. However, personality also changes. Research on the Big 5 Personality traits include a decrease in openness and extraversion in adulthood; an increase of agreeableness with age; peak conscientiousness in middle age; and a decrease of neuroticism late in life. The concepts of both adjustment and growth as developmental processes help reconcile the large body of evidence for personality stability and the growing body of evidence for personality change.

== Intelligence in adulthood ==
According to the lifespan approach, intelligence is a multidimensional and multidirectional construct characterized by plasticity and interindividual variability. Intellectual development throughout the lifespan is characterized by decline as well as stability and improvement. Mechanics of intelligence, the basic architecture of information processing, decreases with age. Pragmatic intelligence, knowledge acquired through culture and experience, remains relatively stable with age.

The psychometric approach assesses intelligence based on scores on standardized tests such as the Wechsler Adult Intelligence Scale and Stanford Binet for children. The Cognitive Structural approach measures intelligence by assessing the ways people conceptualize and solve problems, rather than by test scores.

=== Developmental trends in intelligence ===
Primary mental abilities are independent groups of factors that contribute to intelligent behavior and include word fluency, verbal comprehension, spatial visualization, number facility, associative memory, reasoning, and perceptual speed. Primary mental abilities decline around the age of 60 and may interfere with life functioning. Secondary mental abilities include crystallized intelligence (knowledge acquired through experience) and fluid intelligence (abilities of flexible and abstract thinking). Fluid intelligence declines steadily in adulthood while crystallized intelligence increases and remains fairly stable with age until very late in life.

== Relationships ==
A combination of friendships and family is the support system for many individuals and an integral part of their lives from young adulthood to old age.

=== Family ===
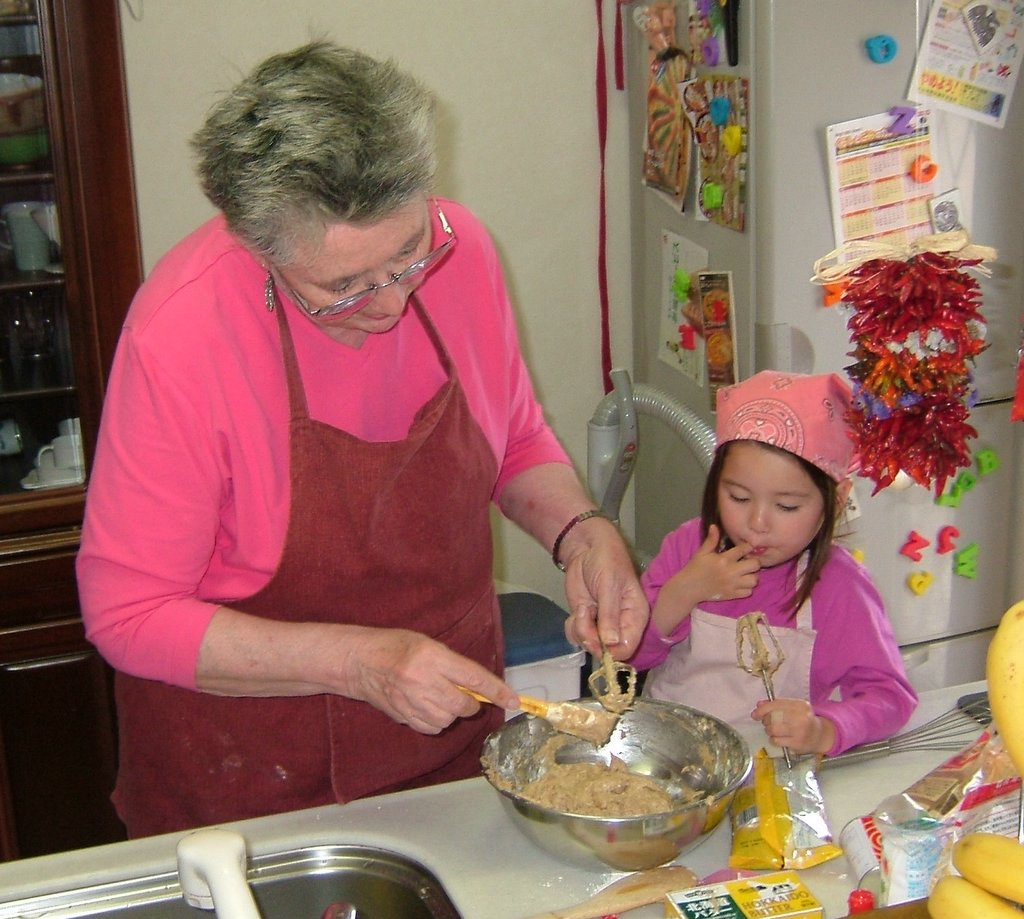
Ties to family become increasingly important in old age.

Family relationships tend to be some of the most enduring bonds created within one's lifetime. As adults age, their children often feel a sense of filial obligation, in which they feel obligated to care for their parents. Adult children can often be informal caregivers to their parents as they help them with personal needs, chores, and finances.

Marital satisfaction remains high in older couples, oftentimes increasing shortly after retirement. This can be attributed to increased maturity and reduced conflict within the relationship. However, when health problems arise, the relationship can become strained. Studies of spousal caregivers of individuals with Alzheimer's disease show marital satisfaction is significantly lower than in couples who are not affected. Most people will experience the loss of a family member by death within their lifetime. This life event is usually accompanied by some form of bereavement, or grief. There is no set time frame for a mourning period after a loved one passes away, rather every person experiences bereavement in a different form and manner.

In the United States, Hispanic populations tend to have far less poor disease outcomes in comparison to non-Hispanic whites. The support that individuals receive when diagnosed with health problems has been proven to have a significant impact on how well the person handles it later on. Social support from not only family but friends as well can influence a person's survival rate and health outcome. The cultural differences of social relationships between Hispanics and non-Hispanic whites may help to explain this paradox. Typically, Hispanic families may be more resilient against disease outcomes because of having a stronger support system including family and friends.

=== Friends ===
Friendships, similar to family relationships, are often the support system for many individuals and a fundamental aspect of life from young adulthood to old age. Social friendships are important to emotional fulfillment, behavioral adjustment, and cognitive function. Research has shown that emotional closeness in relationships greatly increases with age even though the number of social relationships and the development of new relationships begin to decline. In young adulthood, friendships are grounded in similar aged peers with similar goals, though these relations might be less permanent than other relationships. In older adulthood, friendships have been found to be much deeper and longer lasting. While small in number, the quality of relationships is generally thought to be much stronger for older adults.

== Retirement ==
Retirement, or the point in which a person stops employment entirely, is often either a time of psychological distress or a time of high quality and enhanced subjective well-being for individuals. Most individuals choose to retire around the age of 65, and researchers have examined how this transition affects subjective well-being in old age. One study examined subjective well-being in retirement as a function of marital quality, life course, and gender. Results indicated a positive correlation between well-being for married couples who retire around the same time compared to couples in which one spouse retires while the other continues to work.

=== Retirement communities ===
Retirement communities provide for individuals who want to live independently but do not wish to maintain a home. They can maintain their autonomy while living in a community with individuals who are similar in age as well as within the same stage of life. The senior living industry has transformed greatly since its formation in the early 1960s. Newer active adult communities consist of added services to better accommodate those who might feel as if they're missing something compared to their previous lifestyle. These improved retirement communities are meant to help create a standard of living which strengthen engagement, socialization, and most importantly, creating a purpose for its residents.

Compared to the previous generation, older adults (born between 1946 and 1964) seem to typically search for a lifestyle that consist of the ability to continue their life and search for the "next" best thing in their lives. These can be interpreted as a career change, volunteer opportunities, learning a new skill, new degree, or even just a refocus on their health and wellness. An integration of technology into these communities allows there to be applications for convenience, non-intrusive monitoring of vitals, and the ability for members of the community to be in contact with other family members and friends 24/7. It is reported that residents have a greater awareness over their wellness factors and are more efficiently able to set their goals.

=== Phased retirement ===
Often jobs become a part of people's identities because they work there for so long. Abrupt retirement does not allow them to come to terms with losing this part of their identity. This can create psychological distress and can make people not want to retire. It is painful and can be unhealthy to just fully retire instead of phasing into retirement, however, phased retirement has its own pros and cons.

However, phasing may make people have to lessen their involvement and commitment which still which could be difficult as they may feel less needed and still feel that sense of losing part of their identity.

== Long-term care ==
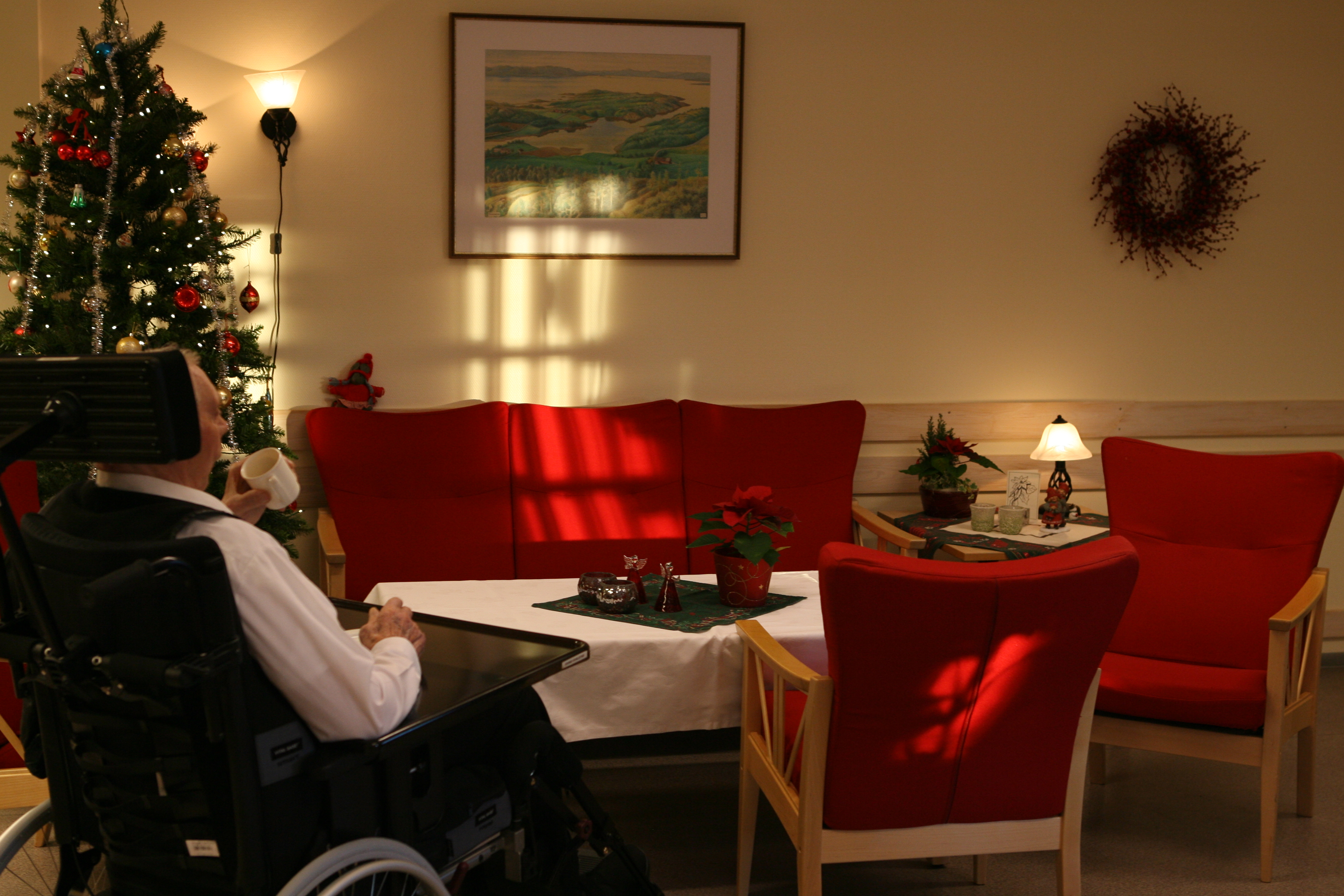
Resident in an assisted living facility

Assisted living facilities are housing options for older adults that provide a supportive living arrangement for people who need assistance with personal care, such as bathing or taking medications, but are not so impaired that they need 24-hour care. These facilities provide older adults with a home-like environment and personal control while helping to meet residents' daily routines and special needs.

Adult daycare is designed to provide social support, supervision, companionship, healthcare, and other services for adult family members who may pose safety risks if left at home alone while another family member, typically a caregiver, must work or otherwise leave the home. Adults who have cognitive impairments should be carefully introduced to adult daycare.

Nursing home facilities provide residents with 24-hour skilled medical or intermediate care. A nursing home is typically seen as a decision of last resort for many family members. While the patient is receiving comprehensive care, the cost of nursing homes can be very high with only a few insurance companies choosing to cover it. There is research that looks into other methods of care, such as independent care or independent living.

Independent living communities are facilities where people may have access to fully furnished homes or private apartments. Independent living communities are useful for seniors who want to preserve their independence while dealing with a limited number of medical issues. Independent living communities are noted for their strong sense of community, which is enhanced by social outings and other recreational activities. These continuing care communities offer this type of care to residents as a way to maintain a comprehensive continuum of care and other services as their needs fluctuate.

== See also ==
- Positive adult development
