= Sarcopenia =

Early onset muscle loss due to ageing or immobility

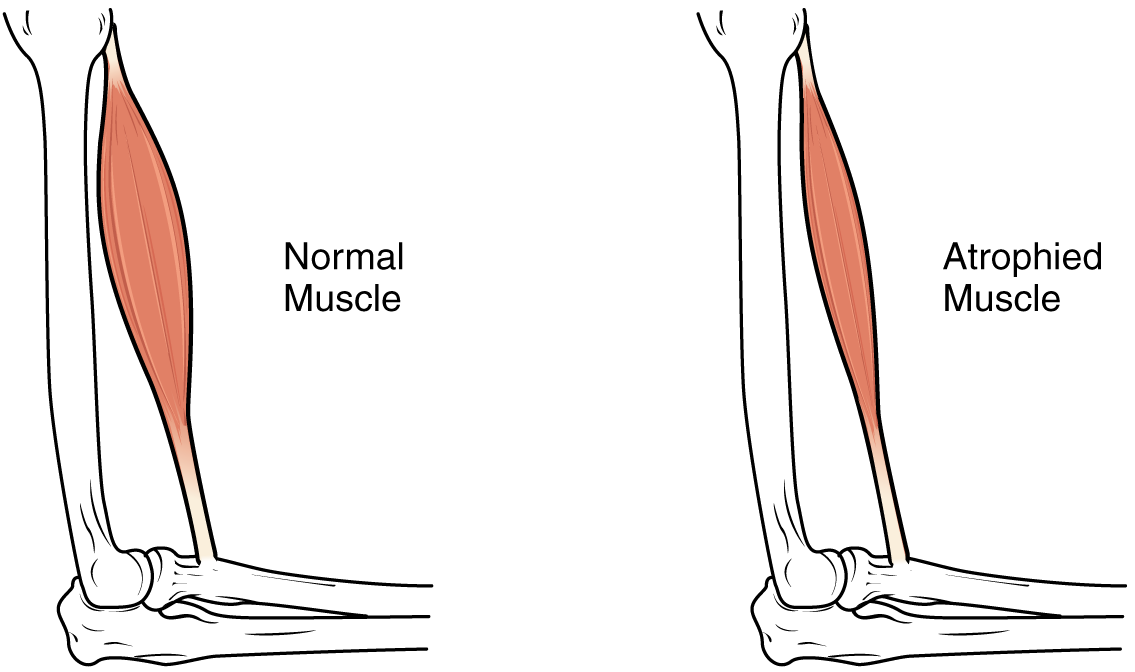
- Difference between a normal muscle and an atrophied muscle
- Specialty: Geriatrics; Rheumatology

Sarcopenia (ICD-10-CM code M62.84) is a type of muscle loss that occurs with aging and/or immobility. It is characterized by the degenerative loss of skeletal muscle mass, quality, and strength. The rate of muscle loss is dependent on exercise level, co-morbidities, nutrition and other factors. The muscle loss is related to changes in muscle synthesis signalling pathways. It is distinct from cachexia, in which muscle is degraded through cytokine-mediated degradation, although the two conditions may coexist. Sarcopenia is considered a component of frailty syndrome. Sarcopenia can lead to reduced quality of life, falls, fracture, and disability.

Sarcopenia is a factor in changing body composition. When associated with aging populations, certain muscle regions are expected to be affected first, specifically the anterior thigh and abdominal muscles. In population studies, body mass index (BMI) is seen to decrease in aging populations while bioelectrical impedance analysis (BIA) shows body fat proportion rising.

== Signs and symptoms ==
The hallmark sign of sarcopenia is loss of lean muscle mass, or muscle atrophy. The change in body composition may be difficult to detect due to obesity, changes in fat mass, or edema. Changes in weight or limb or waist circumference are not reliable indicators of muscle mass changes. Sarcopenia may also cause reduced strength, functional decline and increased risk of falling. Sarcopenia may also have no symptoms until it is severe and is often unrecognized. Hypertrophy may occur in the upper parts of the body to compensate for this loss of lean muscle mass. An early indicator for the onset of sarcopenia can be significant loss of muscle mass in the anterior thigh and abdominal muscles.

== Causes ==
There are many proposed causes of sarcopenia and it is likely the result of multiple interacting factors. Understanding of the causes of sarcopenia is incomplete, however. Changes in hormones, immobility, age-related muscle changes, nutrition, and neurodegenerative changes have all been recognized as potential causative factors.

The degree of sarcopenia is determined by two factors: the initial amount of muscle mass and the rate at which muscle mass declines. Due to variations in these factors across the population, the rate of progression and the threshold at which muscle loss becomes apparent is variable. Immobility dramatically increases the rate of muscle loss, even in younger people. Other factors that can increase the rate of progression of sarcopenia include decreased nutrient intake, low physical activity, or chronic disease. Additionally, epidemiological research has indicated that early environmental influences may have long-term effects on muscle health. For example, low birth weight, a marker of a poor early environment, is associated with reduced muscle mass and strength in adult life.

== Pathophysiology ==
There are multiple theories proposed to explain the mechanisms of muscle changes of sarcopenia including changes in myosatellite cell recruitment, changes in anabolic signaling, protein oxidation, inflammation, and developmental factors. The pathologic changes of sarcopenia include a reduction in muscle tissue quality as reflected in the replacement of muscle fibers with fat, an increase in fibrosis, changes in muscle metabolism, oxidative stress, and degeneration of the neuromuscular junction. The failure to activate satellite cells upon injury or exercise is also thought to contribute to the pathophysiology of sarcopenia. Additionally, oxidized proteins can lead to a buildup of lipofuscin and cross-linked proteins causing an accumulation of non-contractile material in the skeletal muscle and contribute to sarcopenic muscle.

In sarcopenic muscle the distribution of the types of muscle fibers changes with a decrease in type II muscle fibers, or "fast twitch", with little to no decrease in type I muscle fibers, or "slow-twitch" muscle fibers. Deinervated type II fibers are often converted to type I fibers by reinnervation by slow type I fiber motor nerves. Males are perhaps more susceptible for this aging-related switching of the myofiber type, as a recent research has shown a higher percentage of "slow twitch" muscle fibers in old compared to young males, but not in old compared to young females.

Aging sarcopenic muscle shows an accumulation of mitochondrial DNA mutations, which has been demonstrated in various other cell types as well. Clones with mitochondrial mutations build up in certain regions of the muscle, which goes along with an about fivefold increase in the absolute mtDNA copy number, that is, these regions are denser. An apparent protective factor preventing cells' buildup of damaged mitochondria is sufficient levels of the protein BNIP3. Deficiency of BNIP3 leads to muscle inflammation and atrophy.

Furthermore, not every muscle is as susceptible to the atrophic effects of aging. For example, in both humans and mice it has been shown that lower leg muscles are not as susceptible to aging as upper leg muscles. This could perhaps be explained by the differential distribution of myofiber type within each muscle group, but this is unknown.

== Diagnosis ==
Multiple diagnostic criteria have been proposed by various expert groups and continues to be an area of research and debate. Despite the lack of a widely accepted definition, sarcopenia was assigned an ICD-10 code (M62.84) in 2016, recognizing it as a disease state.

Sarcopenia can be diagnosed when a patient has muscle mass that is at least two standard deviations below the relevant population mean and has a slow walking speed. The European Working Group on Sarcopenia in Older People (EWGSOP) developed a broad clinical definition for sarcopenia, designated as the presence of low muscle mass and either low muscular strength or low physical performance. Other international groups have proposed criteria that include metrics on walking speed, distance walked in 6 minutes, or grip strength. Hand grip strength alone has also been advocated as a clinical marker of sarcopenia that is simple and cost effective and has good predictive power, although it does not provide comprehensive information.

There are screening tools for sarcopenia that assess patient reported difficulty in doing daily activities such as walking, climbing stairs or standing from a chair and have been shown to predict sarcopenia and poor functional outcomes.

=== Biomarkers ===
As sarcopenia is a complex clinical diagnosis, circulating biomarkers have been proposed as proxies for early diagnosis and prediction as well as for follow-up and serial assessment of response to interventions.

Aging and sarcopenia are associated with an increase in inflammatory markers ("inflamm-aging") including: C-reactive protein, tumor necrosis factor, interleukin-8, interleukin-6, granulocyte-monocyte colony-stimulating factor, interferons, and serine protease A1.

Changes in hormones associated with aging and sarcopenia include a reduction in the sex-hormones testosterone and dehydroepiandrosterone sulfate, as well as reduced levels of circulating growth hormone and IGF-1.

Circulating C-terminal agrin fragments (CAF) have been found to be higher in accelerated sarcopenic patients.

Lower plasma levels of the amino acids leucine and isoleucine as well as other essential amino acids were found in frail older people compared to non-frail controls.

Alanine aminotransferase (ALT) is responsible for the transfer of the α-amino group from an α-amino acid to an α-keto acid, transforming pyruvate to alanine in skeletal muscle. Low circulating ALT is a marker for low muscle mass and sarcopenia, as well for increased disease activity in patients with inflammatory bowel disease.

== Management ==
=== Exercise ===
Exercise remains the intervention of choice for sarcopenia, but translation of research findings into clinical practice is challenging. The type, duration and intensity of exercise are variable between studies, preventing a standardized exercise prescription for sarcopenia. Lack of exercise is a significant risk factor for sarcopenia and exercise can dramatically slow the rate of muscle loss. Exercise can be an effective intervention because aging skeletal muscle retains the ability to synthesize proteins in response to short-term resistance exercise. Progressive resistance training in older adults can improve physical performance (gait speed) and muscular strength. Increased exercise can produce greater numbers of cellular mitochondria, increase capillary density, and increase the mass and strength of connective tissue.

=== Medication ===
There are currently no approved medications for the treatment of sarcopenia. Testosterone or other anabolic steroids have also been investigated for treatment of sarcopenia, and seem to have some positive effects on muscle strength and mass, but cause several side effects and raise concerns of prostate cancer in men and virilization in women. Additionally, recent studies suggest testosterone treatments may induce adverse cardiovascular events.

DHEA and human growth hormone have been shown to have little to no effect in this setting. Growth hormone increases muscle protein synthesis and increases muscle mass, but does not lead to gains in strength and function in most studies. This, and the similar lack of efficacy of its effector insulin-like growth factor 1 (IGF-1), may be due to local resistance to IGF-1 in aging muscle, resulting from inflammation and other age changes.

Other medications under investigation as possible treatments for sarcopenia include ghrelin, vitamin D, angiotensin converting enzyme inhibitors, and eicosapentaenoic acid.

=== Nutrition ===
Intake of calories and protein are important stimuli for muscle protein synthesis. Older adults may not utilize protein as efficiently as younger people and may require higher amounts to prevent muscle atrophy. A number of expert groups have proposed an increase in dietary protein recommendations for older age groups to 1.0–1.2 g/kg body weight per day. Ensuring adequate nutrition in older adults is of interest in the prevention of sarcopenia and frailty, since it is a simple, low-cost treatment approach without major side effects.

=== Supplements ===
A component of sarcopenia is the loss of ability for aging skeletal muscle to respond to anabolic stimuli such as amino acids, especially at lower concentrations. However, aging muscle retains the ability of an anabolic response to protein or amino acids at larger doses. Supplementation with larger doses of amino acids, particularly leucine has been reported to counteract muscle loss with aging. Exercise may work synergistically with amino acid supplementation.

β-hydroxy β-methylbutyrate (HMB) is a metabolite of leucine that acts as a signalling molecule to stimulate protein synthesis. It is reported to have multiple targets, including stimulating mTOR and decreasing proteasome expression. Its use to prevent the loss of lean body mass in older adults is consistently supported in clinical trials. More research is needed to determine the precise effects of HMB on muscle strength and function in this age group.

=== Whole-Body Vibration ===
Whole-body vibration from sitting, standing, or exercising on a vibrating platform is associated with moderate improvements in muscle strength and physical performance in older adults with sarcopenia without increase in muscle mass.

== Epidemiology ==
The prevalence of sarcopenia depends on the definition used in each epidemiological study. Estimated prevalence in people between the ages of 60 and 70 is 5–13% and increases to 11–50% in people more than 80 years of age. This equates to >50 million people and is projected to affect >200 million in the next 40 years given the rising population of older adults.

== Public health impact ==
Sarcopenia is emerging as a major public health concern given the increased longevity of industrialized populations and growing geriatric population. Sarcopenia is a predictor of many adverse outcomes including increased disability, falls and mortality. Immobility or bed rest in populations predisposed to sarcopenia can cause dramatic impact on functional outcomes. In the elderly, this often leads to decreased biological reserve and increased vulnerability to stressors known as the "frailty syndrome". Loss of lean body mass is also associated with increased risk of infection, decreased immunity, and poor wound healing. The weakness that accompanies muscle atrophy leads to higher risk of falls, fractures, physical disability, need for institutional care, reduced quality of life, increased mortality, and increased healthcare costs. This represents a significant personal and societal burden and its public health impact is increasingly recognized.

== Etymology ==
The term sarcopenia stems from Greek σάρξ sarx, "flesh" and πενία penia, "poverty". This was first proposed by Rosenberg in 1989, who wrote that "there may be no single feature of age-related decline that could more dramatically affect ambulation, mobility, calorie intake, and overall nutrient intake and status, independence, breathing, etc".

== Research directions ==
There are significant opportunities to better understand the causes and consequences of sarcopenia and help guide clinical care. This includes elucidation of the molecular and cellular mechanisms of sarcopenia, further refinement of reference populations by ethnic groups, validation of diagnostic criteria and clinical tools, as well as tracking of incidence of hospitalization admissions, morbidity, and mortality. Identification and research on potential therapeutic approaches and timing of interventions is also needed.

As of 2020, there are no drugs approved to treat muscle wasting in people with chronic diseases, and there is therefore an unmet need for anabolic drugs with few side effects. One aspect hindering drug approval for treatments for cachexia and sarcopenia is disagreement in endpoints. Several clinical trials have found that selective androgen receptor modulators (SARMs) improve lean mass in humans, but it is not clear whether strength and physical function are also improved. After promising results in a phase II trial, a phase III trial of the SARM ostarine was proven to increase lean body mass but did not show significant improvement in function. It and other drugs—such as the growth hormone secretagogue anamorelin—have been refused regulatory approval despite significant increases in lean mass due to a lack of evidence that they increased physical performance. Preventing decline in functionality was not considered an acceptable endpoint by the Food and Drug Administration. It is not known how SARMs interact with dietary protein intake and resistance training in people with muscle wasting.

== See also ==
- Ageing – Biological process of getting older
- Cachexia – Syndrome causing muscle loss
- Dynapenia – Loss of muscular strength not caused by neurological or muscular disease
- Frailty syndrome – Weakness in elderly person
- Geriatrics – Medical specialty that focuses on health care of elderly people
