= Classification of obesity =

Overview of the classification of the condition of obesity

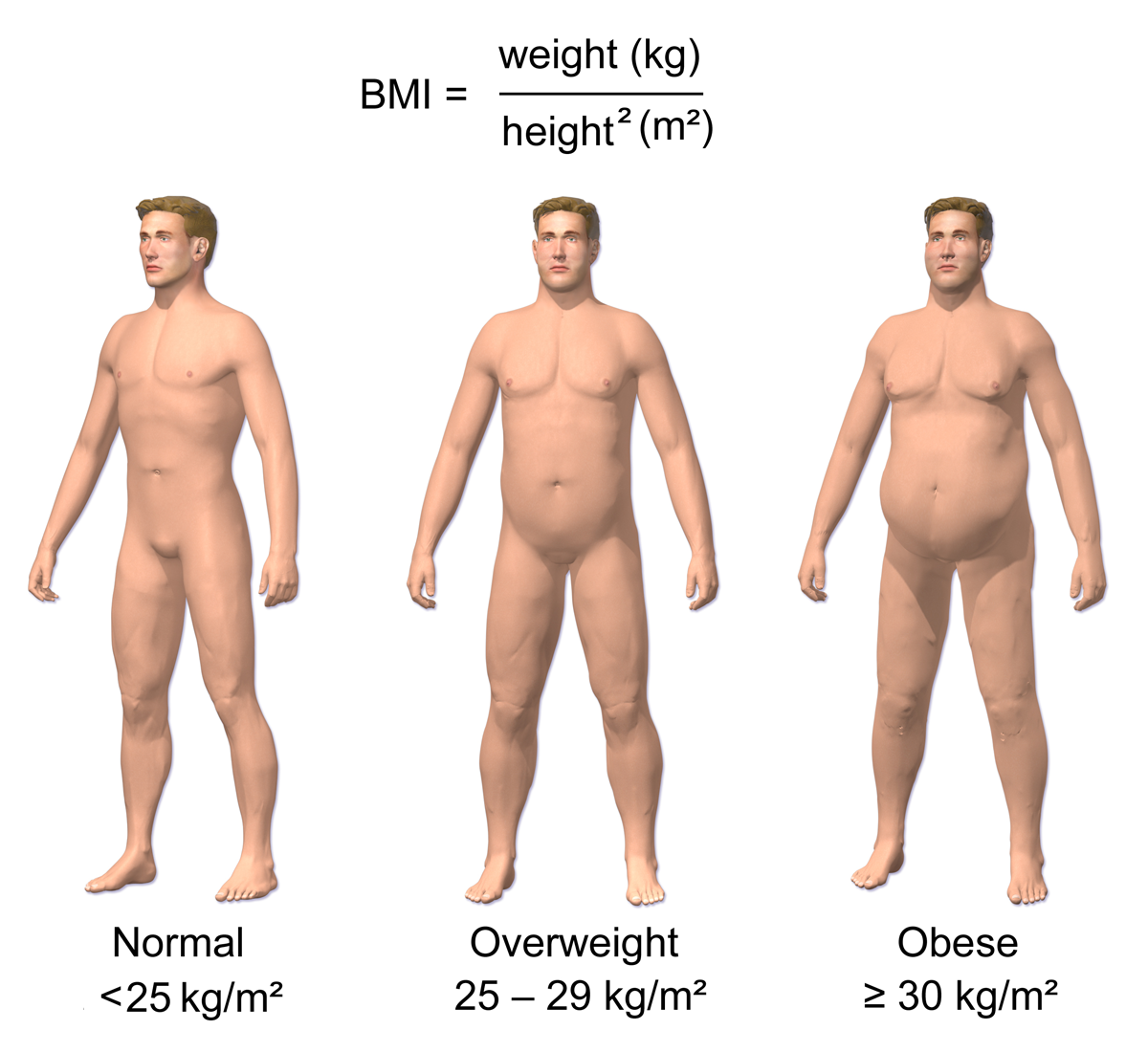
Obesity and BMI

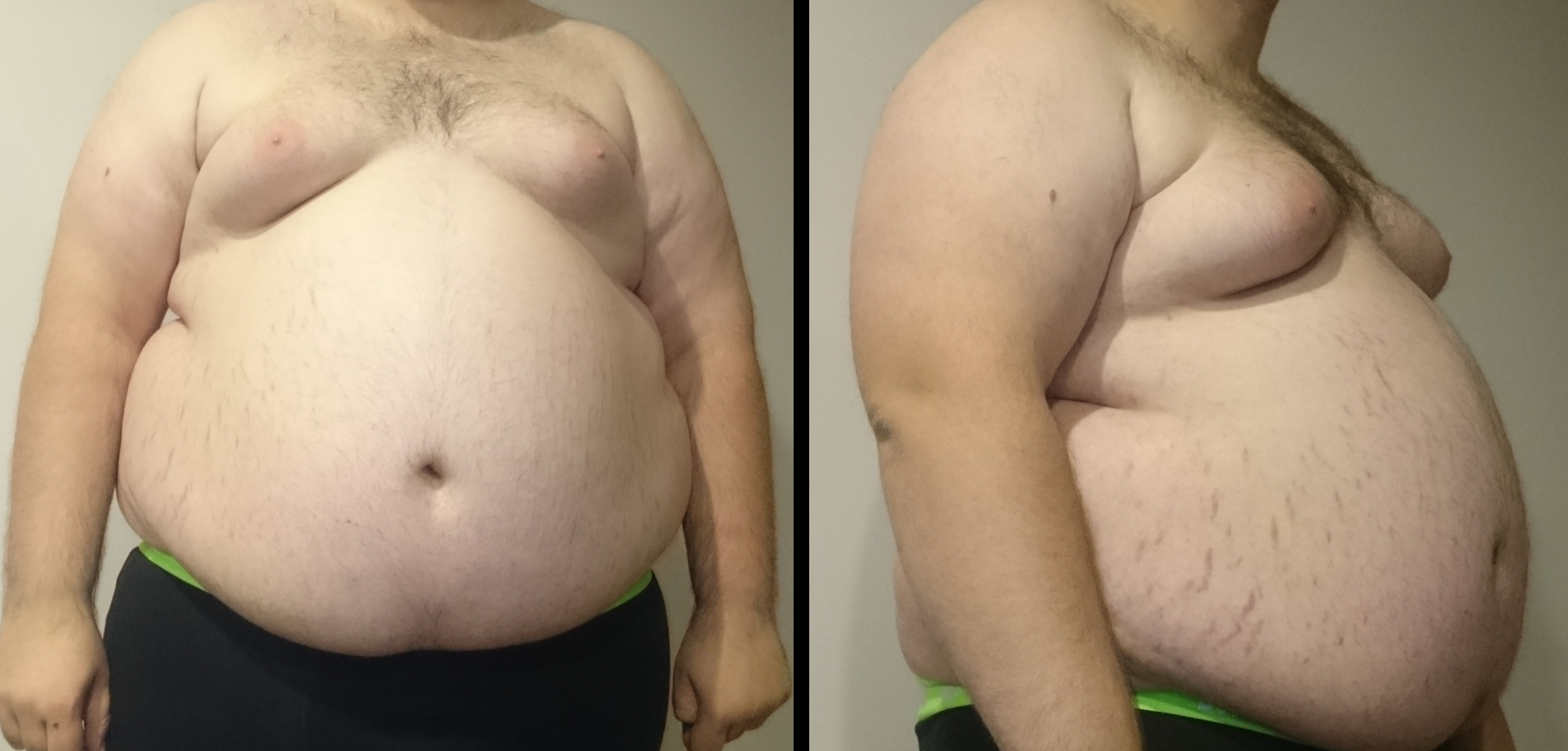
An obese male with a body mass index of 53 kg/m^{2}: weight 182 kg (400 lb), height 185 cm (6 ft 1 in)

Obesity classification is a ranking of obesity, the medical condition in which excess body fat has accumulated to the extent that it has an adverse effect on health. The World Health Organization (WHO) classifies obesity by body mass index (BMI). BMI is further evaluated in terms of fat distribution via the waist–hip ratio and total cardiovascular risk factors. In children, a healthy weight varies with sex and age, and obesity determination is in relation to a historical normal group.

== Background ==
Obesity is a medical condition in which excess body fat has accumulated to the extent that it has an adverse effect on health. Relative weight and body mass index (BMI) are nearly identical and are reasonable estimates of body fatness as measured by percentage body fat. However, BMI does not account for the wide variation in body fat distribution, and may not correspond to the same degree of fatness or associated health risk in different individuals and populations. Other measurements of fat distribution include the waist–hip ratio and body fat percentage. Normal weight obesity is a condition of having normal body weight, but high body fat percentages with the same health risks of obesity. BMI can be used to predict the risk of metabolic abnormalities like diabetes.

== Measurements ==
=== BMI ===
Body mass index or BMI is a simple and widely used method for estimating body fat mass. BMI was developed in the 19th century by the Belgian statistician and anthropometrist Adolphe Quetelet. BMI is an accurate reflection of body fat percentage in the majority of the adult population. However it is less accurate in people such as body builders and pregnant women. A formula combining BMI, age, and gender can be used to estimate a person's body fat percentage to an accuracy of 4%. An alternative method, body volume index (BVI), is being developed by Mayo Clinic in an effort to better take into account different body shapes. BVI measures body fat distribution and calculates the BVI number, based on these results. This BVI number is an indication of weight associated health risk.

Category	BMI (kg/m^{2})
Underweight	< 18.5
Normal weight	18.5 – 24.9
Overweight	25.0 – 29.9
Obese (Class I)	30.0 – 34.9
Obese (Class II)	35.0 – 39.9
Obese (Class III)	≥ 40.0

BMI is calculated by dividing the subject's mass by the square of their height, typically expressed either in metric or US "customary" units:

Metric: $\mathrm{BMI}=\frac{\mathrm{kilograms}}{\mathrm{meters}^2}$

US/Customary and imperial: $\mathrm{BMI}=\mathrm{pounds}\frac{703}{\mathrm{inches}^2}$

The most commonly used definitions, established by the World Health Organization (WHO) in 1997 and published in 2000, provide the values listed in the table at right.

Some modifications to the WHO definitions have been made by particular bodies. The surgical literature breaks down class III obesity into further categories, though the exact values are still disputed.

- Any BMI ≥ 35 is severe obesity
- A BMI of ≥ 40 is morbid obesity
- A BMI of ≥ 50 is extreme obesity

As Asian populations develop negative health consequences at a lower BMI than Western populations, some nations have redefined obesity. The Japanese have defined obesity as any BMI greater than 25 while China defines it as any BMI of greater than 28.

The BMI-based definition is easy to use and it is particularly convenient for statistical purposes, since it only depends on two commonly measured quantities, one's height and weight. However, it ignores variations between individuals in amounts of lean body mass, particularly muscle mass. Individuals involved in heavy physical labor or sports may have high BMI values despite having little fat. For example, more than half of all NFL players are classified as "obese" (BMI ≥ 30), and 1 in 4 are classified as "extremely obese" (BMI ≥ 35), according to the BMI metric. However, their mean body fat percentage, 14%, is well within what is considered a healthy range.

The preferred obesity metric in scholarly circles is the body fat percentage (BF%) - the ratio of the total weight of person's fat to his or her body weight, and BMI is viewed merely as a way to approximate BF%. Levels in excess of 32% for women and 25% for men are generally considered to indicate obesity. Sumo wrestlers may be categorized by BMI as "severely obese" or "very severely obese" but many Sumo wrestlers are not categorized as obese when body fat percentage is used instead (having <25% body fat). Some Sumo wrestlers were found to have no more body fat than a non-Sumo comparison group, with high BMI values resulting from their high amounts of lean body mass. However, accurate measurement of body fat percentage is much more difficult than measurement of BMI. Several methods of varying accuracy and complexity exist.

Other proposed but less common obesity measures include waist circumference and waist–hip ratio. These measure a common form of obesity known as abdominal or central obesity, characterized by excess deposits of fat in the abdominal region and inside peritoneal cavity. They have been shown to be comparable to BMI in their power to predict the risk of metabolic abnormalities such as type II diabetes, and possibly superior to BMI as predictors of cardiovascular disease.

=== Preclinical and Clinical Obesity ===
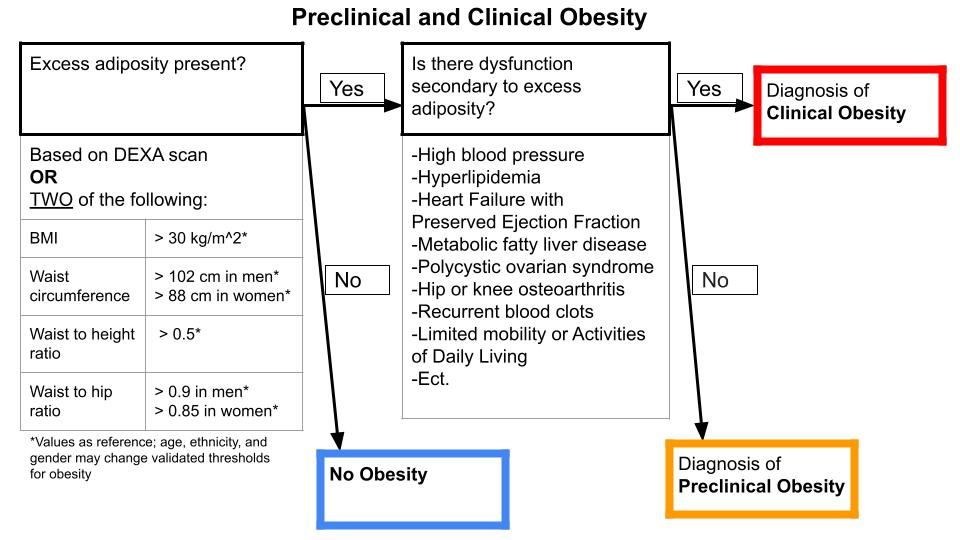
A workflow for the diagnosis of preclinical and clinical obesity

In January 2025, a group of 58 experts on obesity published a consensus article offering a new definition and classification for obesity. They propose a new classification of preclinical and clinical obesity, in this model there is no designation of overweight. For this classification, BMI as well as other measures such as waist circumference are taken into account as well as a patient's other weight related co-morbidities. For a diagnosis of obesity patients must have evidence of excess adiposity as found in one of three ways as 1) measured by dual-energy X-ray absorptiometry, or 2) combination of BMI with one other physical measurement such as waist circumference, waist to hip ratio, or waist to height ratio, or by 3) combination of two of the aforementioned measurements without use of BMI. To differentiate between preclinical and clinical obesity there must be evidence of tissue or organ disfunction or a reduction in a person's ability to perform activities of daily living due to this excess adiposity. If evidence of such dysfunction or limitation is found in an individual who has obesity, they will meet criteria for the new diagnosis of clinical obesity. If no evidence is found then the diagnosis of preclinical obesity is given to indicate that they are still at risk for developing such dysfunction in the future. This model is new and how it will be applied clinically is still uncertain.

=== Waist circumference and waist–hip ratio ===
In the United States a waist circumference of >102 cm (≈40") in men and >88 cm (≈34.5") in women or the waist–hip ratio (the circumference of the waist divided by that of the hips) of >0.9 for men and >0.85 for women are used to define central obesity.

In the European Union waist circumference of ≥ 94 cm(≈37") in men and ≥ 80 cm(≈31.5") in non-pregnant women are used as cut offs for central obesity.

A lower cut off of 90 cm has been recommended for South Asian and Chinese men, while a cut off of 85 cm has been recommended for Japanese men.

In those with a BMI under 35, intra-abdominal body fat is related to negative health outcomes independent of total body fat. Intra-abdominal or visceral fat has a particularly strong correlation with cardiovascular disease. In a study of 15,000 people, waist circumference also correlated better with metabolic syndrome than BMI. Women with abdominal obesity have a cardiovascular risk similar to that of men. In people with a BMI over 35, measurement of waist circumference however adds little to the predictive power of BMI as most individuals with this BMI have abnormal waist circumferences.

=== Body Volume Index ===
The Body Volume Index (BVI) is a novel method for calculating body fat distribution. Human body volumes and body volume ratios and their links to body compositions have been researched for several years. Later the term Body Volume Index (BVI) instead of ratio was introduced by Select Research and Mayo Clinic; BVI has been developed as an alternative to BMI. BMI doesn't account for muscle and fat distribution, or gender, or ethnicity; and therefore is not an accurate measure of obesity in many individuals. BVI uses 3D technology to analyse overall body shape, identifying where fat is distributed across the body.

Body Volume means the composition of a person and their body parts; each part of a person's body (arms, legs, chest, etc.) has its own 3D shape, individual weight and measurement. An increase in the volume of fat and muscle normally corresponds with an increase or decrease of volume in that area of the body. BVI calculates a person's body fat composition from two images taken front and side on. A silhouette is extracted from these images and a 3D model created, from which detailed linear and volume measurements can be calculated. By comparing the 3D models to MRI data, BVI software is able to calculate fat distribution, and in particular visceral fat accumulated near the individual's organs. The results will provide accurate measurements for waist and hip circumferences, waist to hip ratio, total body fat, visceral fat and BVI number.

The BVI Number has been designed by Mayo Clinic as an alternative to the BMI number. The BVI algorithm also accounts for demographic factors, such as age and gender, and is based on weight distribution across different parts of the body. The BVI is expressed as a single numerical value on a scale from 1 to 20. A higher BVI number indicates a higher calculated risk for cardio-metabolic complications and other health risks associated with body fat distribution. A BVI score below 13 is considered lower-risk, while scores above 13 are associated with increased risk, accounting for the tendency of risk to increase with age. It provides an indication of health risk based on fat distribution with a particular emphasis on visceral fat; which is located around organs. Visceral fat is metabolically active, with high levels a known risk factor for metabolic disease which includes cardiovascular disease and diabetes type II.

=== Body fat percentage ===
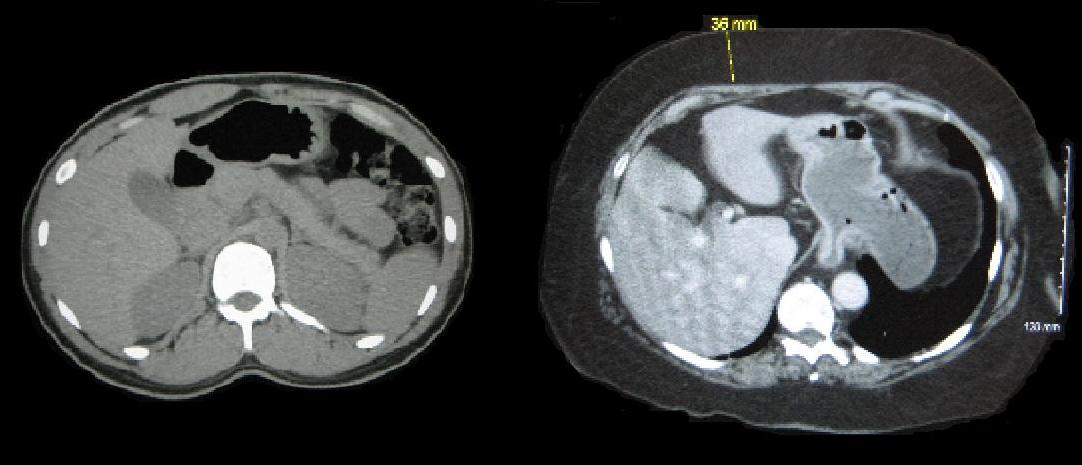
Cross-sections of the torso of a person of normal weight (left) and an obese person (right), taken by CT scan. Note the 3.6 cm (1.4 inches) of subcutaneous fat on the obese person. Some obese people would present on abdominal CT with visceral fat and negligible subcutaneous fat instead.

Body fat percentage is total body fat expressed as a percentage of total body weight. There is no generally accepted definition of obesity based on total body fat. Most researchers have used >25% in men, and >30% in women, as cut-points to define obesity, but the use of these values have been disputed.

As by anthropometric methods, body fat percentage can be estimated from a person's BMI by the following formula:

$$\text{(Adult) body fat percentage} = (1.39 \times \text{BMI}) + (0.16 \times \text{age}) - (10.34 \times \text{gender}) - 9$$

where gender (sex) is 0 if female and 1 if male to account for the lower body fat percentage of men.

There are many other methods used to determine body fat percentage. Hydrostatic weighing, one of the most accurate methods of body fat calculation, involves weighing a person underwater. Two other simpler and less accurate methods have been used historically but are now not recommended. The first is the skinfold test, in which a pinch of skin is precisely measured to determine the thickness of the subcutaneous fat layer. The other is bioelectrical impedance analysis which uses electrical resistance. Bioelectrical impedance has not been shown to provide an advantage over BMI.

Body fat percentage measurement techniques used mainly for research include computed tomography (CT scan), magnetic resonance imaging (MRI), and dual energy X-ray absorptiometry (DEXA). These techniques provide very accurate measurements, but it can be difficult to obtain in the severely obese due to weight limits of most equipment and insufficient diameter of many CT or MRI scanners.

== Childhood obesity ==
The healthy BMI range varies with the age and sex of the child. Obesity in children and adolescents is defined as a BMI greater than the 95th percentile. The reference data that these percentiles are based on is from 1963 to 1994 and thus has not been affected by the recent increases in rates of obesity.

Childhood obesity has reached epidemic proportions in the 21st century with rising rates in both the developed and developing world. Rates of obesity in Canadian boys have increased from 11% in the 1980s to over 30% in the 1990s, while during this same time period rates increased from 4 to 14% in Brazilian children.

As with obesity in adults many different factors contribute to the rising rates of childhood obesity. Changing diet and decreasing physical activity are believed to be the two most important in causing the recent increase in the rate of obesity. Activities from self-propelled transport, to school physical education, and organized sports has been declining in many countries.

Because childhood obesity often persists into adulthood, and is associated with numerous chronic illnesses, it is important that children who are obese be tested for hypertension, diabetes, hyperlipidemia, and fatty liver.

Treatments used in children are primarily lifestyle interventions and behavioral techniques. Medications are not FDA approved for use in this age group.

== See also ==
- Allometry – Study of the relationship of body size to shape, anatomy, physiology, and behavior
- Body adiposity index – Method of estimating the amount of human body fat (BAI)
- Body fat percentage – Total mass of fat divided by total body mass (BFP)
- Body mass index – Relative weight based on mass and height (BMI)
- Body mass index Prime – Relative weight based on mass and height
- Body roundness index – Body scale based on waist circumference and height
- Body Shape Index – Human health index
- Body Volume Index – Overview of the classification of the condition of obesity
- Body water – Water content of an animal's body
- Corpulence index – Measure of leanness (corpulence) of a person
- List of countries by Body Mass Index (BMI)
- Obesity paradox – Medical hypothesis
- Pignet Index
- Relative Fat Mass – Ratio-based formula for estimating obesity in humans
- Sagittal Abdominal Diameter – Height of the abdomen measured in the supine position
- Waist–hip ratio – Indicator of health or fertility
- Waist-to-height ratio – Measure of the distribution of body fat
