= Abdominal obesity =

Excess fat around the stomach and abdomen

- Other names: Central obesity, truncal obesity; see also § Colloquialisms
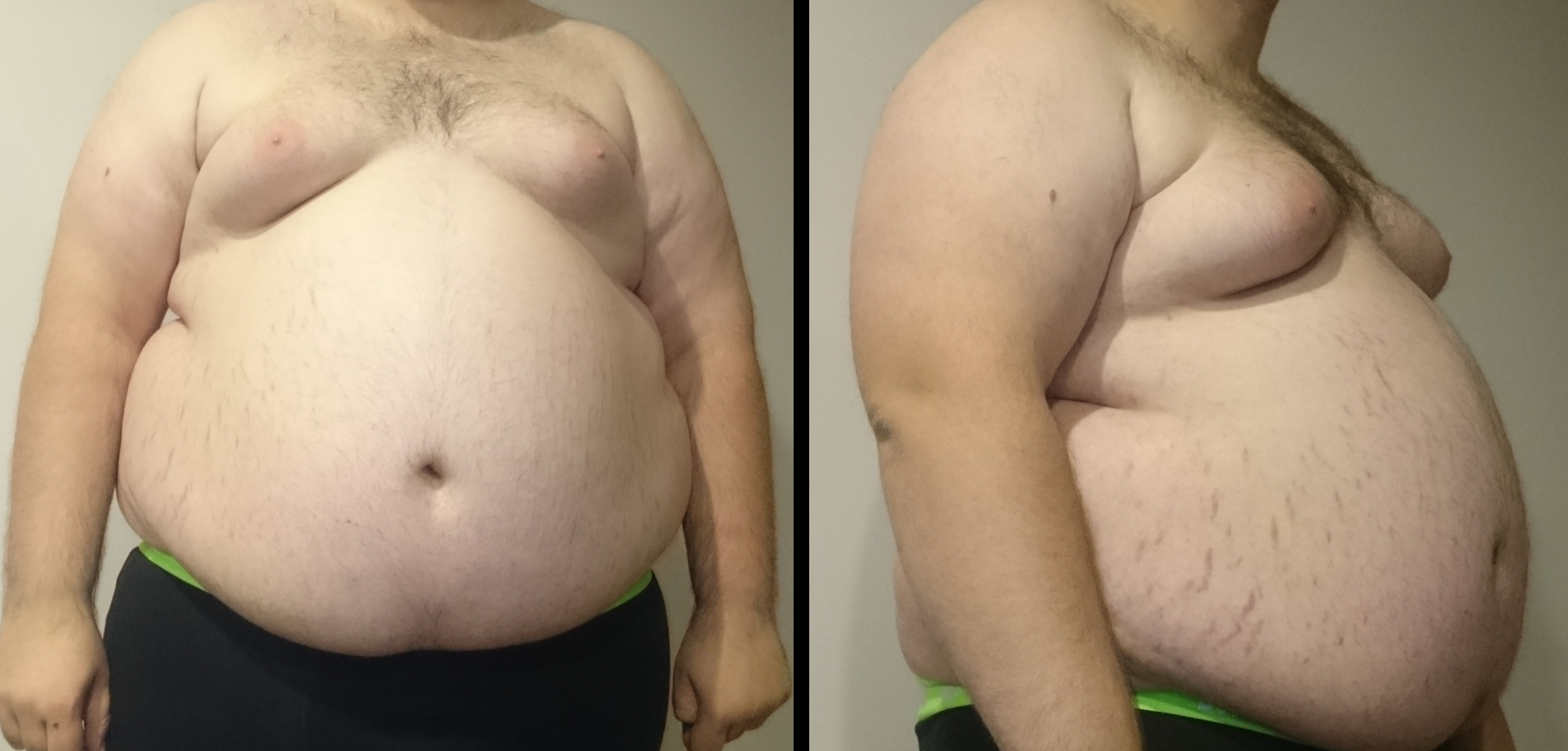
- An abdominous obese male Weight: 182 kg/400 lbs Height: 185 cm/6 ft 1 in Body mass index: 53
- Specialty: Endocrinology
- Complications: Heart disease, asthma, stroke, diabetes
- Causes: Sedentary lifestyle, overeating, Cushing's syndrome, alcoholism, PMOS, Prader-Willi syndrome

Abdominal obesity, also known as central obesity and truncal obesity, is the human condition of an excessive concentration of visceral fat around the stomach and abdomen to such an extent that it is likely to harm its bearer's health. Abdominal obesity has been strongly linked to cardiovascular disease, Alzheimer's disease, and other metabolic and vascular diseases.

Visceral fat, central abdominal fat, and waist circumference show a strong association with type 2 diabetes.

Visceral fat, also known as organ fat or intra-abdominal fat, is located inside the peritoneal cavity, packed in between internal organs and torso, as opposed to subcutaneous fat, which is found underneath the skin, and intramuscular fat, which is found interspersed in skeletal muscle. Visceral fat is composed of several adipose depots including mesenteric, epididymal white adipose tissue (EWAT), and perirenal fat. An excess of adipose visceral fat is known as central obesity, the "pot belly" or "beer belly" effect, in which the abdomen protrudes excessively. This body type is also known as "apple shaped", as opposed to "pear shaped" in which fat is deposited on the hips and buttocks.

Researchers first started to focus on abdominal obesity in the 1980s when they realized it had an important connection to cardiovascular disease, diabetes, and dyslipidemia. Abdominal obesity was more closely related to metabolic dysfunctions connected with cardiovascular disease than was general obesity. In the late 1980s and early 1990s, insightful and powerful imaging techniques were developed that would further help advance the understanding of the health risks associated with body fat accumulation. Techniques such as computed tomography and magnetic resonance imaging made it possible to categorize mass of adipose tissue located at the abdominal level into intra-abdominal fat and subcutaneous fat.

== Health risks ==
=== Heart disease ===
Abdominal obesity is typically associated with a statistically higher risk of heart disease, hypertension, insulin resistance, and type 2 diabetes (see below). With an increase in the waist to hip ratio and overall waist circumference the risk of death increases as well. Metabolic syndrome is associated with abdominal obesity, blood lipid disorders, inflammation, insulin resistance, type 2 diabetes, and an increased risk of developing cardiovascular disease. It is now generally believed that intra-abdominal fat is the depot that conveys the biggest health risk.

Recent validation has concluded that total and regional body volume estimates correlate positively and significantly with biomarkers of cardiovascular risk and that BVI calculations correlate significantly with all biomarkers of cardiovascular risk.

Abdominal obesity is linked with higher cardiovascular events among South Asian ethnic populations.

=== Diabetes ===
There are numerous theories as to the exact cause and mechanism in type 2 diabetes. Central obesity is known to predispose individuals for insulin resistance. Abdominal fat is especially active hormonally, secreting a group of hormones called adipokines that may possibly impair glucose tolerance. But adiponectin, an anti-inflammatory adipokine, which is found in lower concentration in obese and diabetic individuals has shown to be beneficial and protective in type 2 diabetes mellitus (T2DM).

Insulin resistance is a major feature of diabetes mellitus type 2, and central obesity is correlated with both insulin resistance and T2DM itself. Increased adiposity (obesity) raises serum resistin levels, which in turn directly correlate to insulin resistance. Studies have also confirmed a direct correlation between resistin levels and T2DM. And it is waistline adipose tissue (central obesity) which seems to be the foremost type of fat deposits contributing to rising levels of serum resistin. Conversely, serum resistin levels have been found to decline with decreased adiposity following medical treatment.

=== Asthma ===
Developing asthma due to abdominal obesity is also a main concern. As a result of breathing at low lung volume, the muscles are tighter and the airway is narrower. Obesity causes decreased tidal volumes due to a reduction in chest expansion that is caused both by the weight on the chest itself and the effect of abdominal obesity on flattening the diaphragm. It is commonly seen that people who are obese breathe quickly and often, while inhaling small volumes of air. People with obesity are also more likely to be hospitalized for asthma. A study has stated that 75% of patients treated for asthma in the emergency room were either overweight or obese.

=== Alzheimer's disease ===
Based on studies, it is evident that obesity has a strong association with vascular and metabolic disease which could potentially be linked to Alzheimer's disease. Recent studies have also shown an association between mid-life obesity and dementia, but the relationship between later life obesity and dementia is less clear. A study by Debette et al. (2010) examining over 700 adults found evidence to suggest higher volumes of visceral fat, regardless of overall weight, were associated with smaller brain volumes and increased risk of dementia. Alzheimer's disease and abdominal obesity has a strong correlation and with metabolic factors added in, the risk of developing Alzheimer's disease was even higher. Based on logistic regression analyses, it was found that obesity was associated with an almost 10-fold increase risk of Alzheimer's disease.

=== Cancer ===
Abdominal obesity has been associated with an increased risk of several cancers, particularly malignancies of the digestive system. These include colorectal, pancreatic, and esophageal cancers. These associations often remain even after adjustment for overall body mass index, which suggests that abdominal fat distribution is an independent risk factor. In women, abdominal obesity has also been linked to higher rates of breast cancer in both the pre- and post-menopausal periods, beyond the effects of general obesity.

=== Obstructive sleep apnea ===
Abdominal obesity is an important risk factor for obstructive sleep apnea, as increased abdominal fat can place pressure on the airway and narrow it. This can lead to reduced lung volumes during sleep. Higher waist circumference and waist-to-hip ratio are associated with obstructive sleep apnea, even in individuals whose body mass index is only in the overweight range.

=== Other health risks ===
Central obesity can be a feature of lipodystrophies, a group of diseases that is either inherited, or due to secondary causes (often protease inhibitors, a group of medications against AIDS). Central obesity is a symptom of Cushing's syndrome and is also common in patients with polyendocrine metabolic ovarian syndrome (PMOS). Central obesity is associated with glucose intolerance and dyslipidemia. Once dyslipidemia becomes a severe problem, an individual's abdominal cavity would generate elevated free fatty acid flux to the liver. The effect of abdominal adiposity occurs not just in those who are obese, but also affects people who are non-obese and it also contributes to insulin sensitivity.

Ghroubi et al. (2007) examined whether abdominal circumference is a more reliable indicator than BMI or the presence of knee osteoarthritis in obese patients. They found that it actually appears to be a factor linked with the presence of knee pain as well as osteoarthritis in obese study subjects. Ghroubi et al. (2007) concluded that a high abdominal circumference is associated with great functional repercussion.

Research published in The Lancet (2023) found that high levels of visceral fat were related to poorer cognitive performance. The findings suggest that maintaining a healthy weight and metabolic health may be important for preserving cognitive function.

== Causes ==
=== Diet ===
The currently prevalent belief is that the immediate cause of obesity is net energy imbalance—the organism consumes more usable calories than it expends, wastes, or discards through elimination. Some studies indicate that visceral adiposity, together with lipid dysregulation and decreased insulin sensitivity, is related to the excessive consumption of fructose. Some evidence shows that in regards to juveniles, when free fructose is present as children's fat cells mature, it makes more of these cells mature into fat cells in the abdominal region. It also caused both visceral fat and subcutaneous fat to be less sensitive to insulin. These effects were not attenuated when compared to similar glucose consumption.

Intake of trans fat from industrial oils has been associated with increased abdominal obesity in men and increased weight and waist circumference in women. These associations were not attenuated when fat intake and calorie intake was accounted for. Greater meat (processed meat, red meat, and poultry) consumption has also been positively associated with greater weight gain, and specifically abdominal obesity, even when accounting for calories. Conversely, studies suggest that oily fish consumption is negatively associated with total body fat and abdominal fat distribution even when body mass remains constant. Similarly, increased soy protein consumption is correlated with lower amounts of abdominal fat in postmenopausal women even when calorie consumption is controlled.

Numerous large studies have demonstrated that ultra-processed foods have a positive dose-dependent relationship with both abdominal obesity and general obesity in both men and women. Consuming a diet rich in unprocessed food and minimally processed food is linked with lower obesity risk, lower waist circumference and less chronic disease. These findings are consistent among American, Canadian, Latin American, Australian, British, French, Spaniard, Swedish, South Korean, Chinese and Sub-Saharan African populations.

Obesity plays an important role in the impairment of lipid and carbohydrate metabolism shown in high-carbohydrate diets. It has also been shown that quality protein intake during a 24-hour period and the number of times the essential amino acid threshold of approximately 10 g has been achieved is inversely related to the percentage of central abdominal fat. Quality protein uptake is defined as the ratio of essential amino acids to daily dietary protein.

Visceral fat cells will release their metabolic by-products in the portal circulation, where the blood leads straight to the liver. Thus, the excess of triglycerides and fatty acids created by the visceral fat cells will go into the liver and accumulate there. In the liver, most of it will be stored as fat. This concept is known as 'lipotoxicity'.

=== Alcohol consumption ===
A study has shown that alcohol consumption is directly associated with waist circumference and with a higher risk of abdominal obesity in men, but not in women. After controlling for energy under-reporting, which have slightly attenuated these associations, it was observed that increasing alcohol consumption significantly increased the risk of exceeding recommended energy intakes in male participants – but not in the small number of female participants (2.13%) with elevated alcohol consumption, even after establishing a lower number of drinks per day to characterize women as consuming a high quantity of alcohol. Further research is needed to determine whether a significant relationship between alcohol consumption and abdominal obesity exists among women who consume higher amounts of alcohol.

A systemic review and meta-analysis failed to find data pointing towards a dose-dependent relationship between beer intake and general obesity or abdominal obesity at low or moderate intake levels (under ~500 mL/day). However, high beer intake (above ~4 L/wk) appeared to be associated with a higher degree of abdominal obesity specifically, particularly among men.

=== Other factors ===
The prevalence of abdominal obesity is increasing in Western populations, possibly due to a combination of low physical activity and high-calorie diets, and also in developing countries, where it is associated with the urbanization of populations.

Other environmental factors, such as maternal smoking, estrogenic compounds in the diet, and endocrine-disrupting chemicals may be important also.

Hypercortisolism, such as in Cushing's syndrome, also leads to central obesity. Many prescription drugs, such as dexamethasone and other steroids, can also have side effects resulting in central obesity, especially in the presence of elevated insulin levels.

== Diagnosis ==
Silhouettes and waist circumferences representing normal, overweight, and obese

There are various ways of measuring abdominal obesity including:

- Absolute waist circumference (>102 cm (40 in) in men and >88 cm (35 in) in women)
- Waist–hip ratio (the circumference of the waist divided by that of the hips of >0.9 for men and >0.85 for women)
- Waist-stature ratio (waist circumference divided by their height, >0.5 for adults under 40 and >0.6 for adults over 50)
- Sagittal Abdominal Diameter

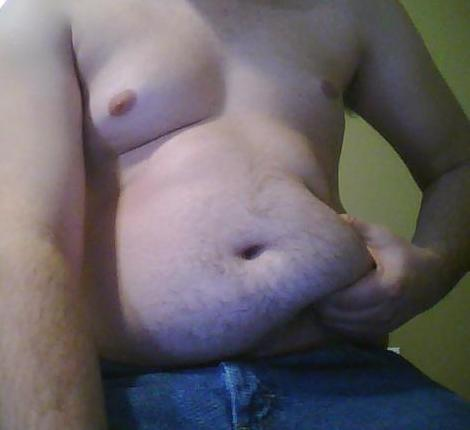
Overweight teenage boy holding his excess abdominal fat

In those with a body mass index (BMI) under 35, intra-abdominal body fat is related to negative health outcomes independent of total body fat. Intra-abdominal or visceral fat has a particularly strong correlation with cardiovascular disease.

BMI and waist measurements are well recognized ways to characterize obesity. However, waist measurements are not as accurate as BMI measurements. Waist measurement (e.g., for BFP standard) is more prone to errors than measuring height and weight (e.g., for BMI standard). BMI will illustrate the best estimate of one's total body fatness, while waist measurement gives an estimate of visceral fat and risk of obesity-related disease. It is recommended to use both methods of measurements.

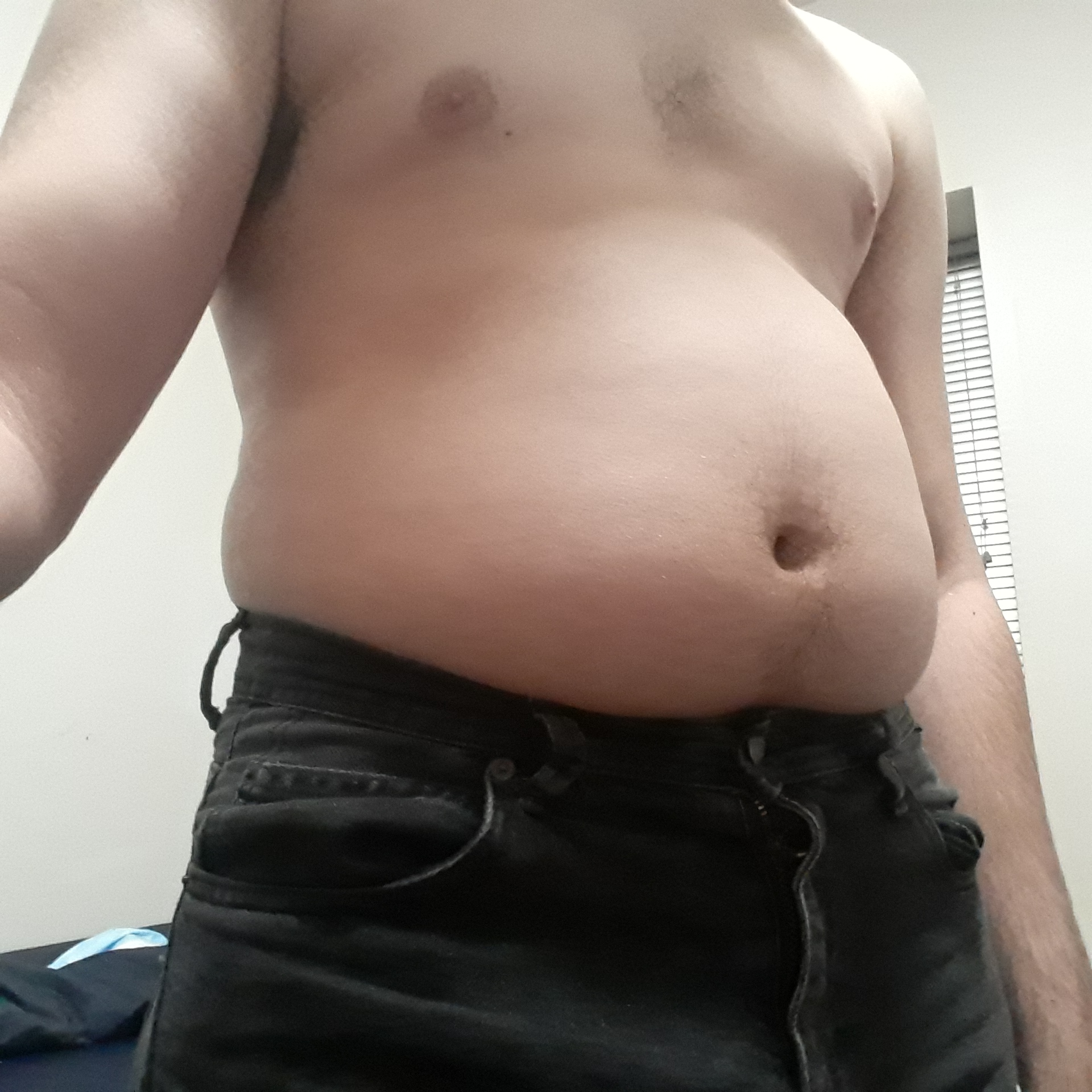
A man with abdominal obesity

While central obesity can be obvious just by looking at the naked body (see the picture), the severity of central obesity is determined by taking waist and hip measurements. The absolute waist circumference 102 centimetres (40 in) in men and 88 centimetres (35 in) in women and the waist–hip ratio (>0.9 for men and >0.85 for women) are both used as measures of central obesity. A differential diagnosis includes distinguishing central obesity from ascites and intestinal bloating. In the cohort of 15,000 people participating in the National Health and Nutrition Examination Survey (NHANES III), waist circumference explained obesity-related health risk better than BMI when metabolic syndrome was taken as an outcome measure and this difference was statistically significant. In other words, excessive waist circumference appears to be more of a risk factor for metabolic syndrome than BMI. Another measure of central obesity which has shown superiority to BMI in predicting cardiovascular disease risk is the Index of Central Obesity (waist-to-height ratio, WHtR), where a ratio of >=0.5 (i.e. a waist circumference at least half of the individual's height) is predictive of increased risk. Another diagnosis of obesity is the analysis of intra-abdominal fat having the most risk to one's personal health. The increased amount of fat in this region relates to the higher levels of plasma lipid and lipoproteins as per studies mentioned by Eric Poehlman (1998) review. An increasing acceptance of the importance of central obesity within the medical profession as an indicator of health risk has led to new developments in obesity diagnosis such as the Body Volume Index, which measures central obesity by measuring a person's body shape and their weight distribution. The effect of abdominal adiposity occurs not just in those who are obese, but also affects people who are non-obese and it also contributes to insulin sensitivity.

=== Index of central obesity ===
Index of Central Obesity (ICO) is the ratio of waist circumference and height first proposed by Parikh et al. in 2007 as a better substitute to the widely used waist circumference in defining metabolic syndrome. The National Cholesterol Education Program Adult Treatment Panel III suggested cutoff of 102 cm (40 in) and 88 cm (35 in) for males and females as a marker of central obesity. The same was used in defining metabolic syndrome. Misra et al. suggested that these cutoffs are not applicable among Indians and the cutoffs be lowered to 90 cm (35 in) and 80 cm (31 in) for males and females. Various race specific cutoffs were suggested by different groups. The International Diabetes Federation defined central obesity based on these various race and gender specific cutoffs. The other limitation of waist circumference is that the measurement procedure has not been standardized and in children there are no, or few, comparison standards or reference data.

Parikh et al. looked at the average heights of various races and suggested that by using ICO various race- and gender-specific cutoffs of waist circumference can be discarded. An ICO cutoff of 0.53 was suggested as a criterion to define central obesity. Parikh et al. further tested a modified definition of metabolic syndrome in which waist circumference was replaced with ICO in the National Health and Nutrition Examination Survey (NHANES) database and found the modified definition to be more specific and sensitive.

This parameter has been used in the study of metabolic syndrome and cardiovascular disease.

Central obesity in individuals with normal BMI is referred to as normal weight obesity.

=== Sex differences ===
There are sex-dependent differences in regional fat distribution.

Males are more susceptible to upper-body fat accumulation, most likely in the belly, due to sex hormone differences. When comparing the body fat of men and women it is seen that men have close to twice the visceral fat as that of pre-menopausal women.

In women, estrogen is believed to cause fat to be stored in the buttocks, thighs, and hips. When women reach menopause and the estrogen produced by ovaries declines, fat at their buttocks, hips, and thighs decreases while fat at their belly increases.

50% of men and 70% of women in the United States between the ages of 50 and 79 years now exceed the waist circumference threshold for central obesity.

Central obesity is positively associated with coronary heart disease risk in women and men. It has been hypothesized that the sex differences in fat distribution may explain the sex difference in coronary heart disease risk. Even with the differences, at any given level of central obesity measured as waist circumference or waist to hip ratio, coronary artery disease rates are identical in men and women.

== Management ==
A permanent routine of exercise, eating healthily, and, during periods of being overweight, consuming the same number or fewer calories than used will prevent and help fight obesity. A single pound of fat yields approximately 3500 calories of energy (32 000 kJ energy per kilogram of fat), and weight loss is achieved by reducing energy intake, or increasing energy expenditure, thus achieving a negative balance. Adjunctive therapies which may be prescribed by a physician are orlistat or sibutramine, although the latter has been associated with increased cardiovascular events and strokes and has been withdrawn from the market in the US, the UK, the EU, Australia, Canada, Hong Kong, and Thailand.

A 2006 study published in the International Journal of Sport Nutrition and Exercise Metabolism suggests that combining cardiovascular (aerobic) exercise with resistance training is more effective than cardiovascular training alone in getting rid of abdominal fat. An additional benefit to exercising is that it reduces stress and insulin levels, which reduce the presence of cortisol, a hormone that leads to more belly fat deposits and leptin resistance. Age-related increases in central adiposity are strongly linked to a progressive decline in basal metabolic rate and loss of lean body mass in adult males. To effectively reduce visceral fat and maintain metabolic health, structured physical activity combining both aerobic and resistance training is recommended.

In the presence of type 2 diabetes, the physician might instead prescribe metformin and thiazolidinediones (rosiglitazone or pioglitazone) as antidiabetic drugs rather than sulfonylurea derivatives. Thiazolidinediones may cause slight weight gain but decrease "pathologic" abdominal fat (visceral fat), and therefore may be prescribed for diabetics with central obesity. Thiazolidinedione has been associated with heart failure and increased cardiovascular risk; so it has been withdrawn from the market in Europe by EMA as of 2010.

New clinical guidelines support the use of glucagon-like-peptide-1 receptor agonists, such as semaglutide, for adults with abdominal obesity who have not been able to achieve adequate weight reduction with lifestyle modifications. These medications have largely replaced the use of other anti-diabetic drugs for weight loss. GLP-1 agonists have shown clinically meaningful reductions in body weight and abdominal obesity, and demonstrated improvements in cardiovascular health in randomized trials.

For patients unresponsive to lifestyle and medication management of abdominal obesity, metabolic and bariatric surgical options exist. These include sleeve gastrectomy and Roux-en-Y gastric bypass surgery. These surgical options are effective in patients with severe abdominal obesity without significant comorbidities. Surgery leads to substantial reductions in abdominal obesity, waist circumference, and is associated with improvements in type 2 diabetes mellitus, hypertension, and other complications associated with abdominal obesity.

Low-fat diets may not be an effective long-term intervention for obesity: as Bacon and Aphramor wrote, "The majority of individuals regain virtually all of the weight that was lost during treatment." The Women's Health Initiative ("the largest and longest randomized, controlled dietary intervention clinical trial") found that long-term dietary intervention increased the waist circumference of both the intervention group and the control group, though the increase was smaller for the intervention group. The conclusion was that mean weight decreased significantly in the intervention group from baseline to year 1 by 2.2 kg (p<.001) and was 2.2 kg less than the control group change from baseline at year 1. This difference from baseline between control and intervention groups diminished over time, but a significant difference in weight was maintained through year 9, the end of the study.

== Society and culture ==
=== Myths ===
There is a common misconception that spot exercise (that is, exercising a specific muscle or location of the body) most effectively burns fat at the desired location, but this is not the case. Spot exercise is beneficial for building specific muscles, but it has little effect, if any, on fat in that area of the body, or on the body's distribution of body fat. The same logic applies to sit-ups and belly fat. Sit-ups, crunches and other abdominal exercises are useful in building the abdominal muscles, but they have little effect, if any, on the adipose tissue located there.

=== Colloquialisms ===
A large central adiposity deposit has been assigned many common use names, including "spare tire", "love handle", "paunch", "boiler", and "potbelly". Several colloquial terms used to refer to central obesity, and to people who have it, refer to beer drinking. However, there is little scientific evidence that beer drinkers are more prone to central obesity, despite its being known colloquially as "beer belly", "beer gut", or "beer pot". One of the few studies conducted on the subject did not find that beer drinkers are more prone to central obesity than nondrinkers or drinkers of wine or spirits. Chronic alcoholism can lead to cirrhosis, symptoms of which include gynecomastia (enlarged breasts) and ascites (abdominal fluid). These symptoms can suggest the appearance of central obesity.

=== Economics ===
Researchers in Copenhagen examined the relationship between waist circumferences and costs among 31,840 subjects aged 50–64 years of age with different waist circumferences. Their study showed that an increase in just an additional centimetre above normal waistline caused a 1.25% and 2.08% rise in health care costs in women and men respectively. To put this in perspective, a woman with a waistline of 95 cm (approx 37.4 in) and without underlying health problems or co-morbidities can incur economic costs that are 22%, or US$397, higher per year than a woman with a normal waist circumference.

== See also ==
- Bariatrics, the branch of medicine that deals with the causes, prevention, and treatment of obesity
- Lipoatrophy, the term describing the localized loss of fat tissue
- Muffin top
- Normal weight obesity, normal BMI with excessive fat, usually centrally localized
- Panniculus, hanging belly fat
- Steatosis, also called fatty change, fatty degeneration or adipose degeneration
