= Body roundness index =

Body scale based on waist circumference and height

- BRI vs height (vertical axis) vs waist circumference (horizontal axis)

Body roundness index (BRI) is a calculated geometric index used to quantify an aspect of a person's individual body shape. Based on the principle of body eccentricity, it provides a visual and anthropometric tool for health evaluation. Mathematically, it is a reformulation of waist-to-height ratio, which is a simple calculation.

Introduced in 2013, the BRI calculation can be used to estimate total and visceral body fat. Ranges of healthy body roundness have been established to accurately classify people with healthy fat mass (weight) compared to obese people who are at risk for morbidities.

Compared to traditional metrics, such as the body mass index (BMI, which uses weight and height), BRI may improve predictions of the amount of body fat and the volume of visceral adipose tissue. Despite its common use, BMI can misclassify individuals as obese because it does not distinguish between a person's lean body mass and fat mass. Instead, BRI quantifies body girth as well as height, potentially providing more accurate estimates of fat mass.

BRI scores range from 1 to 16, with most people between 1 and 10, although people with scores of 6.9 and up—indicating wider, rounder bodies—were found to have a risk of all-cause mortality that was increased by up to 49% compared to people having a medium BRI of 5. In a 2020 review, high BRI was associated with increased risk of metabolic syndrome and several other diseases. Typical American adult BRI values range from 3 or less (midsection leanness) to 7 or more (midsection roundness), with a medium index of about 5.

As a relatively newer predictive metric, BRI has a smaller research record compared to long-established indices like the BMI and waist-to-hip ratio, so its accuracy and applications remain to be as fully established. Conversely, the simple waist-to-height ratio (which uses the same measurements and is simpler to calculate) has a better research base, leading to its adoption as the preferred guideline in some countries.

== History ==
BRI was first reported in 2013 by the mathematician Diana Thomas and colleagues in an analysis of three databases from studies of demographics, anthropometrics, fat mass, and visceral fat volume. Thomas visualized the human body shape as an egg or ellipse rather than as the cylinder model that is envisioned in the concept of the BMI.

The degree of circularity of an ellipse is quantified by eccentricity, with values between 0 and 1, where 0 is a perfect circle (waist circumference same as height) and 1 is a vertical line. To accommodate human shape data in a greater range, Thomas and colleagues mapped eccentricity in a range of 1 to 20 by using the equation:

Body Roundness Index = 364.2 − 365.5 × Eccentricity

== Range of body roundness ==
Body roundness shapes vary across a range of people who are lean (BRI less than 3) to severely obese (BRI more than 12). According to the authors who developed BRI and subsequent research, overlap between adjacent BRI categories may occur.

== Relationship to other anthropometric indices ==
In using human body and fat mass data from the United States National Health and Nutrition Examination Survey (NHANES) database, the Thomas group found that BRI never was a negative value, and that larger BRI values were associated with people having a round shape, while shape values closer to 1 were related to people with narrow, lean bodies. The maximum observed BRI value in the NHANES data was 16.

BRI had similar accuracy in predicting percentage body fat and percentage fat volume as existing indices, such as the BMI. As the conventional index associated with obesity research, the BMI has numerous drawbacks, as it is unable to distinguish between muscle and fat, is inaccurate in predicting body fat percentage, and has poor ability to predict the risk of heart attack, stroke or death.

In a comparison study with BMI and five other metrics – a body shape index, conicity index, body adiposity index, waist–hip ratio, and abdominal volume index (AVI) – BRI and AVI proved most effective at predicting risk of developing nonalcoholic fatty liver disease (NAFLD). BRI and AVI also accurately stratified diagnosis of NAFLD by race, age, and gender.

== Clinical research ==
The BRI has proved effective as an index for identifying risk of death from different diseases, disorders of metabolic syndrome, liver disease, cardiovascular diseases in association with sarcopenia, and bone mineral density. BRI was also a better indicator than the BMI and body shape index for predicting the risk of hypertension, dyslipidemia, and hyperuricemia in Chinese women.

== Limitations ==
vertical axis: height, horizontal axis: waist circumference, dotted grey: WHtR solid black: BRI

Other indices of body and fat mass, such as BMI and waist-to-height ratio, have undergone more research evaluation and longitudinal clinical applications than BRI, and may be better predictors of fat distribution (e.g., visceral vs. subcutaneous fat) for estimating health risks.

Two measurements of the BRI – waist circumference and hip circumference – are subject to high variability in standing obese people. Such variability may indicate differences in fat distribution in people with excessive visceral fat, causing errors in BRI.

Diagnostic factors for diseases associated with obesity, such as ethnicity, family history, dietary habits, and physical activity, are not factored into the BRI, or are other outcomes, such as organ health status and duration of disease.

== Calculation ==
The BRI models the human body shape as an ellipse (an oval), with the intent to relate body girth with height to determine body roundness. A simple tape measure suffices to obtain waist circumference and height. Waist circumference and height can be in any unit of length, as long as they both use the same one.

BRI is calculated as
$$\text{BRI}=364.2-365.5\sqrt{1-\Big(\frac{\text{waist circumference}}{\;\;\;\;\pi\;\;\;\;\;\times\;\;\;\;\;\,\text{height}}\Big)^2}$$
which can be broken down to 3 steps:

Derivation of the BRI formula: 1. / h: the subject's height, c: waist circumference.; 2. / A cylinder with the same height and circumference.; 3. / e: eccentricity of the largest ellipse fitting its side view.

1. Compute Waist-to-height ratio,
  $$\text{WHtR}=\frac{\text{waist circumference}}{\text{height}}$$
  = (28 in)/(5 ft 3 in )
  = (72 cm)/(160 cm)
  = 0.45
2. Compute eccentricity (e) of the vertical ellipse around the body,
  $$\text{e}=\sqrt{1-\Big(\frac{\text{WHtR}}{\pi}\Big)^2}$$
  = sqrt(1-(0.45/3.141592653589793)^2)
  = 0.9896880621248427
3. Compute BRI,
  $$\text{BRI}=364.2-365.5\times\;\text{eccentricity}$$
  = 364.2 - 365.5 * 0.9896880621248427
  = 2.469013293369983 ≈ 2.47

Predictions of % total body fat and % visceral adipose tissue apply a different eccentricity equation using waist and hip circumferences, age, height, gender, ethnicity, and body weight as inputs.

== See also ==
- Allometry – Study of the relationship of body size to shape, anatomy, physiology, and behavior
- Body shape index – Human health index
- Classification of obesity – Overview of the classification of the condition of obesity
- Corpulence index – Measure of leanness (corpulence) of a person
- History of anthropometry – History of measurements of humans
- Normal weight obesity – Metabolically obese normal weight
- Relative fat mass – Ratio-based formula for estimating obesity in humans
- Waist–hip ratio – Indicator of health or fertility
- Waist-to-height ratio – Measure of the distribution of body fat
