= Sagittal abdominal diameter =

Height of the abdomen measured in the supine position

Sagittal abdominal diameter (SAD) is a measure of visceral obesity, the amount of fat in the gut region. SAD is the distance from the small of the back to the upper abdomen. SAD may be measured when standing or supine. SAD may be measured at any point from the narrowest point between the last rib and the iliac crests to the midpoint of the iliac crests.

SAD is a strong predictor of coronary disease, with higher values indicating increased risk independent of BMI.

For persons of normal BMI, SAD should be under 25 centimetres (9.8 in). When this measure exceeds 30 centimetres (12 in) it correlates to increased cardiovascular risk and insulin resistance. For men in their 40s, a SAD greater than 25 cm also predicts significantly higher risk of developing Alzheimer's disease 30 years later. An article in Annals of Neurology links visceral fat to lower brain volume.

== Supine abdominal height (SAH) ==
Supine abdominal height measure

A related measurement is supine abdominal height (SAH), the abdominal height as measured in the supine position. The SAH method is easier for self-monitoring, but gives slightly lower results due to gravity; the values are not directly comparable.

== See also ==
- Central obesity
- Body fat percentage
- Index of Central Obesity
