= Dermatothlasia =

- Specialty: Dermatology

Dermatothlasia is a cutaneous neurosis characterized by a person's uncontrollable desire to rub or pinch him/herself to form bruised areas on the skin, sometimes as a defense against pain elsewhere.
