= Fritz Rohrer =

Swiss physician

Fritz Rohrer (1888–1926) was a Swiss physician, specialised in respiratory physiology. In 1915 he published an analysis of the flow of air in the human lung and its relationship to pressure, based on detailed measurements of the pulmonary airways. This was followed in 1916 by a study of pulmonary statics, with measurements of pressure in the airways at various lung volumes. In 1921 he proposed the corpulence index or Rohrer index, apparently on the basis of observations by Galileo Galilei.
