= Pinch mark =

Pinch marks are a cutaneous condition caused by pinching, and when on the ears or in the genital region of male children may be suggestive of child abuse.

== See also ==
- Runner's rump
- List of cutaneous conditions
