= Runner's rump =

Skin condition

Runner's rump is a cutaneous condition characterized by a small ecchymoses in upper gluteal cleft caused by constant friction with each stride when running.

== See also ==
- Tennis toe
- Painful fat herniation
- Pinch mark
- List of cutaneous conditions
