= Body shape index =

Human health index

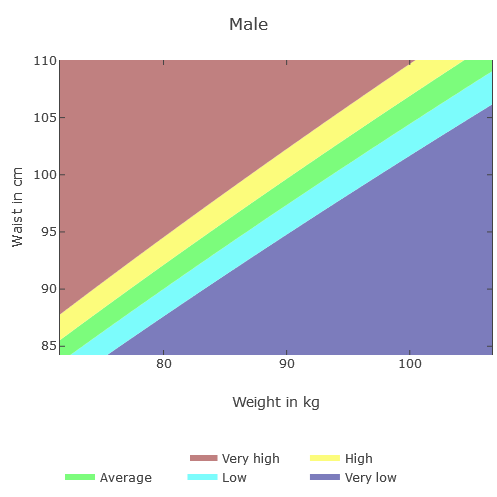
- Risk of premature death for a 35-year-old man, grouped by ABSI value
- Synonyms: ABSI

A Body Shape Index (ABSI) or simply body shape index (BSI) is a metric for assessing a person's risk of premature death using their height, weight (mass), and waist circumference.

The inclusion of waist circumference is believed to make the ABSI a better indicator of risk of mortality from excess weight than the widely used body mass index (BMI). ABSI correlates only slightly with height, weight, and BMI, indicating that it is independent of other anthropometric variables in predicting mortality.

A person's ABSI is given by the formula

$$ABSI = \frac{WC}{\sqrt[3]{BMI\,}\times\sqrt[3]{BMI\,}\times\sqrt{H\,}}$$

where $WC$ is waist circumference (in metres), $H$ is height (in metres), and $BMI$ is body mass index.

This can be written more formally as

$$ABSI = \frac{WC}{BMI^{2/3}\times H^{1/2}}$$

where $WC$, $H$ and $BMI$ have the same meanings as above.

== Comparison to BMI ==
A criticism of BMI is that it does not distinguish between muscle and fat mass and so may be elevated in people with increased BMI due to muscle development rather than fat accumulation. A higher muscle mass may actually reduce the risk of premature death. A high ABSI appears to correspond to a higher proportion of central obesity, or abdominal fat.

In a sample of Americans in the National Health and Nutrition Examination Survey, death rates in some subjects were high for both high and low BMI and WC, a familiar conundrum associated with BMI. In contrast, death rates increased proportionally with increased values of ABSI. The linear relationship was unaffected by adjustments for other risk factors including smoking, diabetes, elevated blood pressure and serum cholesterol.

Studies have associated ABSI with total mortality and cardiovascular risk, indicating that it is useful in assessing cardio-metabolic risks.

== Calculation ==
The equation for ABSI is based on statistical analysis and is derived from an allometric regression.

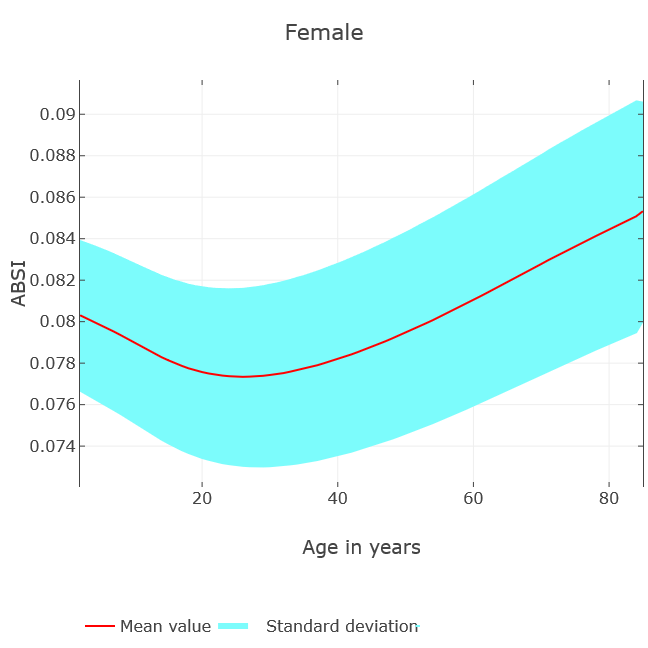
ABSI over age diagram for females

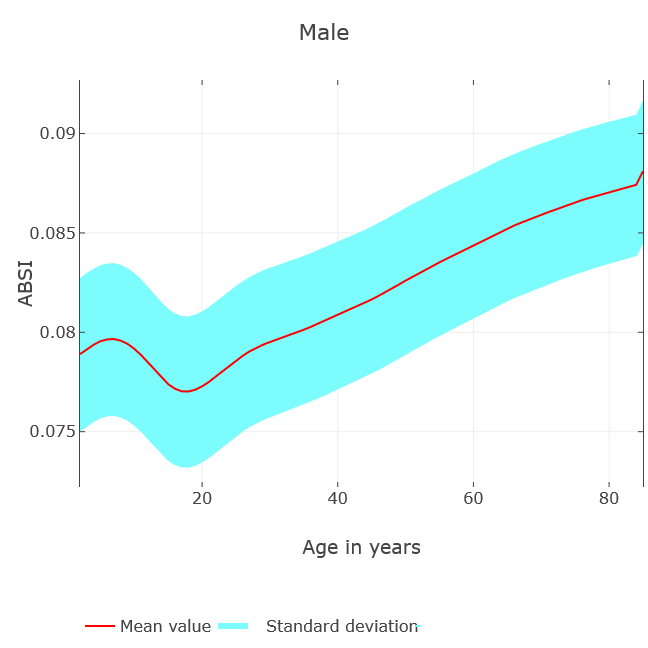
ABSI over age diagram for males

If the ABSI is above 0.083, an increased risk is assumed; a value of 0.091 is said to represent a doubling of the relative risk. The ABSI is classified into risk classes by means of the ABSI-z value (z-score) derived from the ABSI. The ABSI-z is calculated from the deviation of the ABSI from the ABSI mean in relation to the standard deviation. The ABSI means and standard deviations are age- and sex-dependent empirically determined and tabulated. The calculation is made according to the following formula:

$$ABSI_z = \frac{ABSI - ABSI_{\text{mean}}}{ABSI_{\text{stdv}}}$$

where $ABSI_{\text{mean}}$ is the mean ABSI value (adjusted for age and sex), and $ABSI_{\text{stdv}}$ is the standard deviation of ABSI values (adjusted for age and sex).

The ABSI-z allows classification into the following risk groups for health risk.

ABSI-z risk groups
ABSI-z value	Risk
Less than −0.868	Very low
Between −0.868 and −0.272	Low
Between −0.272 and +0.229	Average
Between +0.229 and +0.798	High
Greater than +0.798	Very high

To understand the ABSI, it is important to know the relationship between waist circumference and weight. A reduction in weight alone does not necessarily lead to a better risk class. The ABSI uses the waist circumference to take into account the distribution of fat, especially the proportion of abdominal fat. In other words, a reduction in weight and a constant waist circumference worsens the risk classification, while an increase in weight with the same waist circumference leads to an improvement. Thus, more muscle with a small waist circumference leads to a better risk classification. This is a significant difference to BMI. The following diagram shows the progression of risk groups as a function of weight and waist circumference using the example of a 35-year-old man.

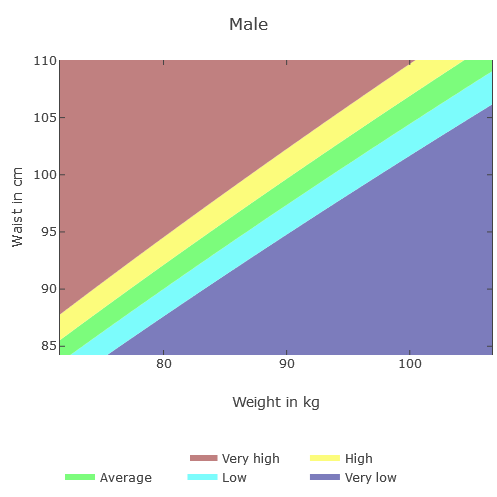
ABSIz risk groups in waist circumference over weight. The diagram shows the progression of risk groups as a function of weight and waist circumference using the example of a 35-year-old man.

== See also ==
- Body roundness index
- Abdominal obesity
