= Normal weight obesity =

Metabolically obese normal weight

- Specialty: Endocrinology
- Treatment: Diet, exercise

Normal weight obesity or metabolically obese normal weight, also known as skinny fat, is the condition of having normal body weight, but with a high body fat percentage, leading to some of the same health risks as obesity.

== Definition ==
The term "metabolically obese normal weight" (MONW) refers to people with normal weight and body mass index (BMI), who display some metabolic characteristics which increase the risk of developing metabolic syndrome in the same way as obesity. People with MONW have excess visceral fat, and are predisposed to hyperinsulinemia, insulin resistance and thus predisposition to type 2 diabetes, hypertriglyceridemia, hypertension and premature coronary heart disease or cardiovascular disease. The BMI does not capture information about percentage body fat (PBF), which is a better predictor of risk due to obesity. Some studies have suggested that the main factor which explains the metabolic abnormalities in MONW individuals is fat distribution. On the basis of these studies, a scoring method has been proposed to identify MONW individuals, based on the presence of associated diseases or biochemical abnormalities related to insulin resistance.

== Prevalence ==
In 2008, the first prevalence of US adults above 20 years was published, based on the National Health and Nutrition Examination Surveys from 1999 to 2004, finding that 24% of normal-weight adults were metabolically abnormal; on the other hand 49% of overweight adults and 68% of obese adults were metabolically abnormal. An analysis from an earlier NHANES from 1988 to 1994 found people with NWO had a four-fold higher frequency of metabolic syndrome compared with the low body fat group. In 2015 the overall presence in the general worldwide population was suggested to be about 20%, with European populations having the highest rate of MONW. Patterns were subject to and also influenced by gender, age, smoking, alcohol use, and region.

== Treatment ==
As of 2018, optimal treatment is unknown. A 1998 study suggested that energy restriction and weight loss—‌for example a 4- to 12-week period of diet and exercise—‌was beneficial. A small study of 11 Asians with MONW published June 2018 found that moderate weight loss through dieting reduced their cardiometabolic risk per improved body composition, lipid profile, and insulin sensitivity.

Magnesium supplementation orally has been shown to improve blood pressure and metabolic profile for those listed as MONW.

== See also ==
- Abdominal obesity
- Body composition
- TOFI
- Sarcopenic obesity
- Waist-to-height ratio
