= Relative fat mass =

Ratio-based formula for estimating obesity in humans

Relative Fat Mass (RFM) is a simple formula for the estimation of overweight or obesity in humans that requires only a calculation based on a ratio of height and waist measurements.

High body fat is associated with increased risks of poor health and early mortality. RFM is a simple anthropometric procedure that is claimed to be more convenient than body fat percentage and more accurate than the traditional body mass index (BMI).

The ratio of the patient's height and waist measurement, both in meters, is multiplied by 20 before being subtracted from a number (shown in bold below) that adjusts for differences in gender and height:

- RFM for adult males: **64** – 20 × (height / waist circumference)
- RFM for adult females: **76** – 20 × (height / waist circumference)

Although generally validated on a database of some 12,000 adults, RFM has not yet been evaluated in longitudinal studies of large populations to identify normal or abnormal RFM in relation to obesity-related health problems.

== See also ==
- Body mass index (BMI)
- Body fat percentage (BFP)
- Body roundness index (BRI)
- Body water (TBW)
- Corpulence index (CI)
