= Pignet Index =

Pignet Index or Body Build Index is an index used for evaluation of body build. It was suggested in 1901 by Maurice–Charles–Joseph Pignet, who was a French army doctor.

Pignet Index is expressed by formula:

Stature in cm - (weight in kg + chest circumference in cm)

Body build according to this index is noted as:

- Very sturdy: <10
- Sturdy: 10-15
- Good: 16-20
- Average: 21-25
- Weak: 26-30
- Very weak: 31-35
- Poor: >36
