= Anthropometric measurement of the developing fetus =

Anthropometry is defined as the scientific study of the human body measurements and proportions. These studies are generally used by clinicians and pathologists for adequate assessments of the growth and development of the fetus at any specific point of gestational maturity. Fetal height, fetal weight, head circumference (HC), crown to rump length (CR), dermatological observations like skin thickness etc. are measured individually to assess the growth and development of the organs and the fetus as a whole and can be a parameter for normal or abnormal development also including adaptation of the fetus to its newer environment.

Another important factor that contributes towards the anthropometric measurement of the human fetal growth is the maternal nutrition and maternal well-being. Malnutrition, as already established by WHO, is a global serious health problem not only in adults but in pregnant and lactating mothers too and is a serious problem in third world countries. In Africa and South Asia, 27%-50% of women in the reproductive age are underweight resulting in 30 million low birth weight babies.

For decades, the topic of question pertaining to crown-rump length (CR), crown-heel length (CH), head circumference (HC) with respect to the body weight of human fetus at different time periods of gestation has baffled many developmental researchers and biostatisticians. These biological variations are all based on linear curves based on human fetuses between 9 and 28 weeks of gestation.

== Co-relation of fetal weight and fetal growth ==
Body weight, for example, is an important function and parameter for growth with respect to gestational age of the fetus. There will be great variations in the body weight of a 16 weeks old fetus. The weight will not be constant for every fetus and will vary from individual to individual. Therefore, rather than an appropriate or standard value, a range can be specified like 90 to 100 grams. This number of variations applies to all other anthropometric measurements. Often, the scientific world cover up their ignorance by stating that the rate of growth of particular human fetus depends on its intrinsic growth potential and environment provided by the normal mother. It is a visible function of the genetic potential.

The fetal growth is not an individual growth and is dependent on the composite growth of the organs. Growth of the individual organs is controlled by the genetic potential, the environment provided by the mother and by the fetus itself. Scientists have or are trying to determine such relationships through series of investigations.

Streetr, Schults et al., all studied the fetal dimensions obtained from spontaneous abortions and pathological pregnancies on mainly formed and fixed specimens. The growth of an organ from inception to a definitive functional stage is dependent on the integrated function of the whole organism which depends on a number of parameters such as the nucleic acid content of the cells which is one of the most important factors. Functioning of an organ is important for development of the organism.

A Nigerian study showed that the birth weight of the human fetus also depends upon the size and weight of the mother including her height and weight. Further a Polish study reported a similar report that some measurements like the ear height, muscular strength of the shoulders, skin fold thickness, mandibular breadth including the height of the upper and the lower limbs can be co-related to the mother also. Similar observations were also reported by Gueri et al.

One of the first original and unique works to be conducted on the anthropometric measurement of the human fetus in the Indian context was conducted by a group of scientists in Calcutta between 1977 and 1987 under the supervision of K.L.Mukherjee, a stalwart in the field of medical biochemistry in Institute of Post Graduate Medical Education and Research. The researchers divided the fetuses into 6 groups consisting of A, B, C, D, E and F with a difference of 4 weeks of gestation period among the 6 groups. Group A had 90 fetuses of 9–12 weeks of gestation and the weight varied between 1-14 grams. Group B had 337 fetuses, age 13–16 weeks of gestation with weight variation between 15 and 105 grams whereas the third group had 435 fetuses of 17–20 weeks of gestation with a weight range between 106 and 310 grams. Group D consisted of 531 fetuses of 21–24 weeks and weight between 331 and 640 grams and Group E had fetuses of the age range 25–28 weeks of gestation and weight 640-1070 grams. The last two groups F and G had fetuses with gestation period between 29-32 and 33–36 weeks. All aborted fetuses were collected after permission from the institute ethics committee followed with donor consent form with primary objective being the aborted mother's health and safety.

== Liver growth ==
Researchers observed that the liver weight is directly proportional to the body weight. At 8–12 weeks of gestation, liver is a relatively bigger organ which forms 4-5-5.5% of the total body weight and protrudes through the abdominal wall. By 13 to 32 weeks of gestation, it forms 3.4% to 4.0% of the total body weight. The liver weight hence forms a more or less constant proportion of the total body weight of the fetus.

== Growth of the lung ==
Although in adult life, the lung is the only major respiratory organ, in case of fetal life such is not the case though the fetal lung is known to expand and contract in the last phase of development. Both the weight of the right and left lungs are normally assessed at different periods of gestation and is expressed as a function of the total body weight.

An irregular graph was observed by K.L.Mukherjee and his group instead of the standard normal linear graphs which should be normally observed after plotting a graph of weight of the lungs expressed as gm/kg of body weight against the body weight. This relationship was observed from fetuses weighing 350 grams to 850 grams after which the rate of the growth became uniformly proportional again.

== Brain and Central nervous System ==
Brain and the central nervous system are the two most important components of the fetus. Further analysis by this same group involved the CNS up to the medulla at 2nd cervical vertebral level. The process of analyzing the fetal brain and the CNS involved dissecting out the whole brain tissue followed by decantation of an 8.5 weeks old fetal brain weighing 15 grams. The brain at this time had already assumed the appearance of primary divisions and flexures, and the prosen, messen and rhombocephalon already gave rise to the different brain-derived constituents like rhinocephalon, corporastriata, cerebral cortex, hypo and epithalamus and pons medulla to a less differentiation extent. The growth of the fetal brain from this time onwards was proportional to the body weight although some brains from other groups showed variations at the same stage between 20% and even 12% or 13% of the body weight by and large. Scientists are still yet to find an explanation for this.

== Kidney and the Adrenal Glands ==
In the early gestational period, the weight of the adrenal glands outweighs even the metanephric kidneys and is comparatively a larger organ. After the 10th week of gestation, the kidney grows at a much rapid rate than the adrenal glands. Hence with an increase in gestational time, i.e. by the 12th week of gestation, both the kidneys and adrenal glands measure the same. Post 12 weeks the kidneys measure more than the adrenal glands. However, the Adrenal gland is a larger organ in the fetus than the adult. The same group of researchers further observed that with the increase of fetal age, the adrenal glands also weigh more as observed by the research group in 90 human fetuses. However, the rate of increase is not uniform and varies throughout the fetal growth like other organs.

== Human fetal testes ==
The growth of the fetal testes is not uniform as revealed through various other studies. The weight of the right testes weighed more than the weight of the left testes. Exceptions were however noticed in some of the cases as reported by K.L.Mukherjee and his group. Normally like all other organs the growth of the testes including its weight also increases with increase in the gestational period. The research group through their graph plot studies further examined that the growth of testes was not uniform with proportional growth at the initial stages. It soon flattened to increase with different spikes consistently throughout the whole length of the gestational period. Further the weight of the human testes marked as mg/100 gram of body weight was investigated and was observed that there was a steep decline in the early gestation period from about 200 mg/100 gram of body weight to roughly about 60 mg/ 100 gram of body weight when the fetal weight was about 1.5 grams to 20 grams. In the case of a 1.6-kilogram fetus, the testes weighed only 20 mg/100 gram of body weight. This decline was however not maintained uniformly.

== Growth of the Human fetal ovaries ==
A steep decline in the ovarian weight in the early gestational period was observed though it was not a uniformly maintained decline. With increase in the gestational time, progressive weight of the ovaries was found and in most cases, the weight of the ovaries was identical to the weight of the fetuses although some exceptions were observed by the group.

== Fetal Thymus growth ==
At 8 weeks of gestation when the fetus weighed 1 gram, the thymus could not be detected. In many of the 39 fetuses weighing around 1.3-14.7 grams, the thymus tissues could not be dissected by the group especially in the smaller fetuses due to its non-detection. Fetuses weighing more than or equal to 5 grams could be detected. Plotting a graph it was observed that thymus organ formed 52 mg/100 gram of body weight in case of a 5 gram fetus. Further study on 28 fetuses weighing 15 to 100 grams revealed the thymic weight to be 77 mg per 100 grams of the body weight. The relative growth of the thymus was more in this group compared to all the earlier observations. A further group including 39 fetuses weighing between 100 and 300 grams showed a fetal thymic weight between 136 mg/100 gram to 77 mg/ 100 gram. In fetuses up to 28 weeks, it was observed by scientists that the fetal thymic weight was the highest and was in contrast to many other organs like brain, liver which constitute more or less constant proportion of the body weight with very few exceptions. Therefore, it was inferred that with an increase in the gestational period, the thymic weight also increase although exceptions were observed.

== Conclusion ==
Growth and development throughout the fetal life are two most important factors which determine the growth rate of each individual and their specific organs. This process of maturation and development of the organs are observed in postnatal life also. With an increase in gestational time, the fetal organs also grow in progression to the body weight, the phenomenon which is still not understood clearly by many researchers. Some believe that genetic potentiality of the different endocrine organs related to the growth and various other unidentified processes mediate the whole phenomenon.

== See also ==
- Anthropometry
- Prenatal Development
