= Intramuscular fat =

Fat located inside skeletal muscle fibers

Intramuscular fat (also known as intramuscular triglycerides, intramuscular triacylglycerol, or intramyocellular triacylglycerol [IMTG]) is located inside skeletal muscle fibers. It is stored in lipid droplets that exist in close proximity to the mitochondria, where it serves as an energy store that can be used during exercise. In humans, excess accumulation of intramuscular fat has been associated with conditions such as insulin resistance and type 2 diabetes. The human immunodeficiency virus (HIV)-lipodystrophy syndrome is associated with over-accumulation of intramuscular fat, which may contribute to AIDS wasting syndrome.

== Diabetes ==
Increased IMTG was once thought responsible for increased insulin resistance. However, the discovery that athletes as well as obese individuals have high IMTG levels confounded these findings. Instead, IMTG metabolites, such as diacylglycerol and ceramide are responsible for the insulin resistance. Studies demonstrating the effects of IMTGs show that the mechanism involves the activation of the protein kinase C theta, which promotes the phosphorylation of IRS-1, thereby inhibiting the insulin signaling cascade.

=== Insulin Resistance ===
Increased plasma free-fatty acid levels and increased accumulation of IMTG correlate well with insulin resistance in muscles. However, athletes often do not exhibit this correlation since they are typically insulin sensitive, while expressing high levels of IMTG. Researchers believe that the improved efficiency of trained skeletal muscles prevents the development of insulin resistance.

== Exercise ==
Intramuscular triacylglycerol serves as an energy store that can be used during exercise, when it may contribute up to 20% of total energy turnover (depending on diet, sex, and exercise type).

Scientists think that a low-calorie diet and exercise-induced proteins (Sterol regulatory element-binding protein) cause the high levels of IMTG in athletes' skeletal muscle. In contrast, the build-up of IMTG in obese individuals correlates to high levels of adipose tissue.

Females have a higher IMTG content and studies have revealed that they use more IMTGs during exercise.
