= Body adiposity index =

Method of estimating the amount of human body fat

The body adiposity index (BAI) is a method of estimating the amount of body fat in humans. The BAI is calculated without using body weight, unlike the body mass index (BMI). Instead, it uses the size of the hips compared to the person's height.

Based on population studies, the BAI is approximately equal to the percentage of body fat for adult men and women of differing ethnicities.

== Formula ==
The BAI is calculated as:

$\frac{100 \times \text{hip circumference in m}}{\text{height in m} \times \sqrt{\text{height}}} - 18$

Hip circumference (Pearson correlation coefficient, R = 0.602) and height (R = −0.524) are strongly correlated with percentage of body fat. Comparing BAI with "gold standard" dual-energy X-ray absorptiometry (DXA) results, the correlation between DXA-derived percentage of adiposity and the BAI in a target population was R = 0.85, with a concordance of C_b = 0.95.

== Uses ==
The BAI could be a good tool to measure adiposity due, at least in part, to the advantages over other more complex mechanical or electrical systems. Probably, the most important advantage of BAI over BMI is that weight is not needed. However, in general it seems that the BAI does not overcome the limitations of BMI.

Stated advantages of the BAI are that it approximates body fat percentage, while the widely used BMI is known to be of limited accuracy, and is different for males and females with similar percentage body adiposity; and that it does not involve weighing, so can be used in remote locations with limited access to scales. A detailed study published in 2012 concluded that estimates of body fat percentage based on BAI were not more accurate than those based on BMI, waist circumference, or hip circumference.

Adiposity indexes that include the waist circumference (for example waist-to-height ratio WHtR) may be better than BAI and BMI in evaluating metabolic and cardiovascular risk in both clinical practice and research.
