= Pinch (action) =

Action performed by gripping a smooth object between two fingers

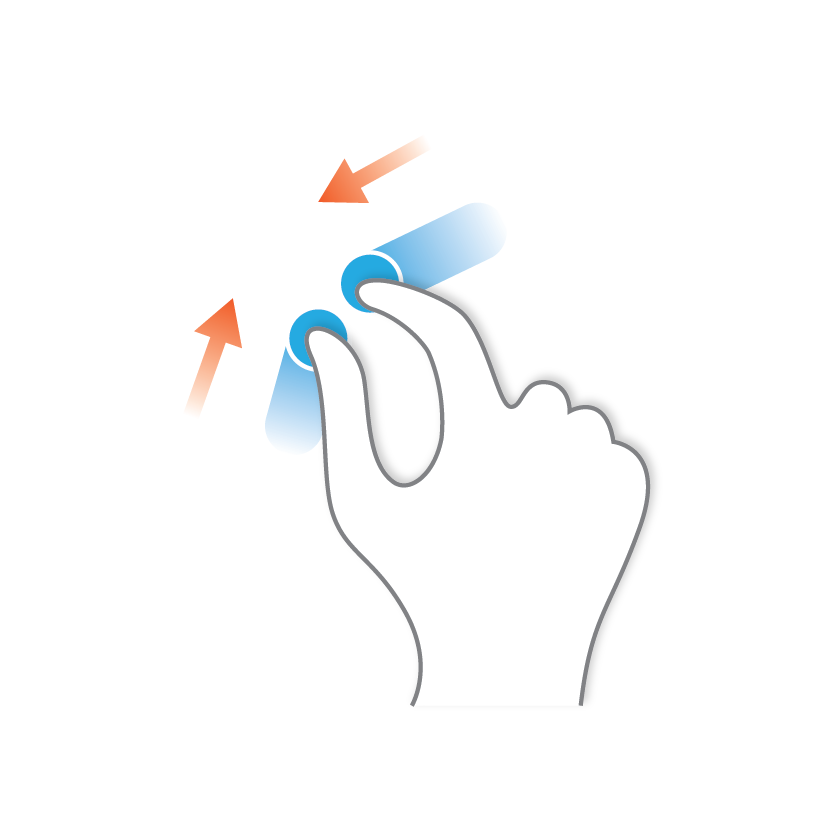
A pinching gesture

A pinch is a grip of a flexible object in which a portion is taken between two fingers, until it hurts, or something of resemblance and squeezed so the gripped portion of the object is lifted from its normal level. By extension, that which is taken in the grip is referred to as a "pinch."

When the fingers are used to perform a pinch, the action usually consists of the thumb and one other finger. The closer to the thumb the other finger is located, the stronger the pinch.

== Pinch of the skin ==
The term "pinch" often refers to the action being taken on the skin. A pinch of the skin displaces the skin and blood beneath from its natural position, and may inflict a minor degree of pain, which may increase if the amount of skin being pinched is smaller, but is usually tolerable to most.

Pinching the skin can result in pinch marks, a cutaneous condition, and when on the ears or in the genital region of male children, may be suggestive of child abuse.

=== Medical uses ===
Pinching has the following uses in health care and medicine:

- The skin is often pinched prior to giving an injection in order to get the needle in the desired location.
- In neurology, pinching can be used to determine pain sensitivity for a certain area of skin.
- Can be used to determine resiliency in the skin of an aged person. When the skin is pinched, the amount of time the pinch remains visible following the pinch is an indicator.
- When skin has been damaged by the sun, pinching can be used to determine the amount of damage. Examining the appearance with varying amounts of time following the pinch can be used to determine the amount of damage.
- In determining dehydration, pinching the skin can serve as a test. The speed at which the pinch turns back can help determine the level of dehydration. The slower it goes back, the more severe the dehydration.
- Body fat percentage can be determined the skinfold test, in which a pinch of skin is precisely measured by calipers at several standardized points on the body to determine the subcutaneous fat layer thickness. These measurements are converted to an estimated body fat percentage by an equation.
- Pinching is used as part of the diagnosis of schleroderma. In schleroderma patients, the skin between the fingers becomes too difficult to pinch.
- In veterinary medicine, small amounts of animal skin is pinched in order to perform grafting.
