= Waist-to-height ratio =

Measure of the distribution of body fat

The waist-to-height ratio (WHtR, (Note: The abbreviation WHR is more commonly used for Waist–hip ratio, although WHpR is preferred.) or WSR: waist-to-stature ratio) is the waist circumference divided by body height, both measured in the same units.

WHtR is a measure of the distribution of body fat. Higher values of WHtR indicate higher risk of obesity-related cardiovascular diseases, which are correlated with both total fat mass (adiposity) and abdominal obesity.

== History ==
In 1996, WHtR was first suggested by Ashwell and Cole as a simple health risk assessment tool because "it was identified as a proxy for harmful central adiposity since WHtR was correlated with abdominal CT scan". A boundary value of 0.5 was proposed to indicate increased risk. A WHtR of over 0.5 signifies an increased risk; a 2010 systematic review of published studies concluded that "WHtR may be advantageous because it avoids the need for age-, sex- and ethnic-specific boundary values".

According to World Health Organization guidance, the waist circumference is usually measured midway between the lower rib and the iliac crest.

== Guidelines ==
=== United Kingdom ===
The UK's National Institute for Health and Care Excellence (NICE): All adults should "ensure their waist size is less than half their height in order to help stave off serious health problems".

=== Consensus statement on redefining obesity ===
As of 2024, the Lancet Commission on obesity and the European Association for the Study of Obesity recommended that obesity should no longer be diagnosed with BMI alone due to its several limitations, but confirmed by other surrogate measures such as WHtR of greater than 0.5. A strategic paradigm shift in obesity diagnosis, NICE provided this guideline in a 2025 advisory (graphs). A major limitation of using BMI to assess obesity is that it cannot distinguish between muscle and fat. Recent research in November 2026 among adults across four countries (the US, the UK, China, and Spain) found that adding waist size and waist-to-height ratio to BMI can identify 3.3% to 7.4% more people at risk of obesity-related health issues.

==== Recommended boundary values ====
The October 2022 NICE guidelines recommend boundary values for WHtR (defining the degree of "central adiposity" (abdominal obesity) as follows:

WHtR	central adiposity	health risks	action?
0.6 or more	high	further increased	Take action
0.5 to 0.59	increased	increased	Take care
0.4 to 0.49	healthy	not increased	none, OK

The NICE statement is that these classifications can be used for people with a body mass index of under 35, for both sexes and all ethnicities, including adults with high muscle mass. The health risks associated with higher levels of central adiposity include type 2 diabetes, hypertension and cardiovascular disease. NICE have proposed the same boundary values for children of 5 years and over.

Boundary values were first suggested for WHtR in 1996 to reflect health implications and were portrayed on a simple chart of waist circumference against height. The boundary value of WHtR = 0.4 was suggested to indicate the start of the 'OK' range. The 0.5 boundary value was suggested to indicate the start of the 'Take Care' range, with the 0.6 boundary value indicating the start of the 'Take Action' range.

The NICE guideline cutpoint is based on ease of memorization, but may be misleading, especially in the pediatric population, which usually does not have 0.6 WHtR values. Rigorous statistical methods have identified 0.50 to less than 0.53 in males as a risk level for high fat mass, and 0.53 and above as risk level for excess fat mass in the pediatric population. Among females, 0.51 to less than 0.54 is the risk level for high fat mass and 0.54 and above is the risk level for excess fat mass. These pediatric estimates have been validated as predictors of risk of type 2 diabetes, fatty liver diseases, and bone fractures in Blacks, Asians, Hispanics and Whites.

==== Simplified guidelines ====
The first boundary value for increased risk of WHtR 0.5 translates into the simple message "Keep your waist to less than half your height". The updated NICE guideline says "When talking to a person about their waist-to-height ratio, explain that they should try and keep their waist to half their height (so a waist-to height ratio of under 0.5)".

=== Calculation ===
$$\text{WHtR}=\frac{\text{waist circumference}}{\text{height}}$$

Example 1: (72 cm)/(160 cm) = 0.45

Example 2: (28 in)/(5 ft 3 in) = (28 in)/(63 in) = 0.44

Any measuring unit will do, as long as the waist and height share the same unit.

== Public health tool ==
WHtR is a proxy for total body and central (visceral or abdominal) adiposity: values of WHtR are significantly correlated with direct measures of total body and central (visceral or abdominal) adiposity using techniques such as CT, MRI or DEXA.

WHtR is an indicator of 'early health risk': several systematic reviews and meta-analyses of data in adults of all ages, have supported the superiority of WHtR over the use of BMI and waist circumference in predicting early health risk. Among children and adolescents, WHtR is an indicator of 'early health risk'.

Cross-sectional studies in many different global populations have supported the premise that WHtR is a simple and effective anthropometric index to identify health risks in adults of all ages, and in children and adolescents. Studies evaluating adiposity metrics in South Asian populations have indicated that central obesity parameters, such as waist-to-height and waist-to-hip ratios, strongly correlate with age-related declines in basal metabolic rate and increases in body fat percentage. This is consistent with earlier findings establishing that waist-to-height ratio is a sensitive indicator of cardiometabolic risk and visceral fat accumulation across diverse demographics.

In a comprehensive narrative review, Yoo concluded that "additional use of WHtR with BMI or WC may be helpful because WHtR considers both height and central obesity. WHtR may be preferred because of its simplicity and because it does not require sex- and age-dependent cut-offs".

Not only does WHtR have a close relationship with morbidity, it also has a clearer relationship with mortality than BMI.

=== As an indicator of both total body and central adiposity ===
Many cross-sectional studies have shown that, even within the normal BMI range, many adults have WHtR which is above 0.5. Many children show the same phenomenon. Risk factors for metabolic diseases and mortality are raised in these subjects.

== See also ==
> vertical axis: height > horizontal axis: waist circumference > colours: NICE risk level > lines: Waist-to-height-ratio

- Allometry – Study of the relationship of body size to shape, anatomy, physiology, and behavior
- Body fat percentage – Total mass of fat divided by total body mass
- Body mass index – Relative weight based on mass and height (total mass divided by the square of height)
- Body roundness index – Body scale based on waist circumference and height
- Body shape – General shape of a human body
- Body shape index – Human health index (waist circumference compared to its allometric average)
- Body water – Water content of an animal's body
- Normal weight obesity – Metabolically obese normal weight
- Waist–hip ratio – Indicator of health or fertility
