= NHL draft combine =

Annual event of the National Hockey League

The NHL draft combine, also called the NHL scouting combine, is an annual event for prospective players of the National Hockey League (NHL). Prior to the NHL entry draft, the NHL Central Scouting Bureau, which manages the event, invites about 100 prospects to the combine. At the combine, prospects participate in medical testing, fitness testing, and interviews. The combine is hosted in Buffalo, New York; it previously took place near Toronto.

The combine has seen many changes since it was first held in 1994, especially to its physical fitness tests. Psychological testing began in 2007. The combine has further changed throughout the 2020s. In 2020 and 2021, it was not held due to the COVID-19 pandemic. Since 2022, Russian prospects in Russia have not been invited due to the country's invasion of Ukraine. The 2025 combine was of increased importance for trade discussions, as that year's entry draft was held virtually.

Many teams see interviews as especially important for assessing players; teams and prospects alike prepare for the interview process, which may include psychological assessment. Outside of the combine, teams may request that prospects complete further testing or interviews. Teams are not allowed to test prospects prior to the combine; the Arizona Coyotes were sanctioned in 2020 for doing so.

The combine has no on-ice testing, a decision that has been criticized by some researchers, fans, and team staff. Researchers and teams have varying assessments of the combine's effectiveness in identifying successful NHL players, noting variation by player position and the specific usefulness of the VO2 max test and the Wingate test.

== History ==
In 1994, the NHL Central Scouting Bureau held the first draft combine with 77 forwards, 49 defencemen, and 6 goaltenders. It was hosted in Mississauga, Ontario, Canada, near Toronto. In Mississauga, combine events were held in a hotel and the International Centre conference center; fitness tests took place in the ballroom, and interviews in hotel rooms. Early draft combines received little media attention.

After the death of Central Scouting director E. J. McGuire in 2011, Dan Marr took on the role and began overseeing the combine. Marr had previously directed scouting and player development for the Atlanta Thrashers.

In 2015, the combine moved to First Niagara Center (now the KeyBank Center) and Harborcenter in Buffalo, New York, after the Buffalo Sabres submitted a bid in 2014. A key point of the Sabres' bid was the promise of on-ice testing, though this never materialized. The NHL initially agreed to allow the Sabres to host the combine for two years, and the combine has continued to be hosted in Buffalo. Proposals to move the combine have failed, with Buffalo's proximity to Toronto being cited as a logistical advantage.

In 2020 and 2021, the combine was cancelled due to the COVID-19 pandemic, though many teams held virtual interviews. In 2023, Central Scouting introduced an app for players to access their profile and schedule. As one of few events bringing together executives from all NHL teams, the combine is also an opportunity for general managers to begin arranging possible trades for the upcoming draft. With the "decentralized" 2025 draft—which teams attended virtually—the combine became a more active site for these discussions.

== Selection ==
Each year, top prospects are invited to the combine. While the exact number of players invited has changed over time, the NHL Central Scouting Bureau usually invites about 100 prospects each year. Central Scouting publishes rankings for players eligible for the upcoming draft; players invited to the combine are all ranked. In 2015, 120 players were invited to the combine; Central Scouting chose about 75, and NHL teams and scouting directors voted on the rest. Dan Marr, director of Central Scouting, has said: "Our goal is to have players at the combine that the teams want to interview." Due to the 2022 Russian invasion of Ukraine, Russian prospects playing in Russia have not been invited to the combine.

== Structure ==
The combine is typically held in June. Since 2015, the combine has been held in Buffalo, New York. The structure of the combine—in both activities and schedule—has changed over the years. During the 2025 combine, interviews took place June 2–6, medical examinations on June 4, the VO2 max test on June 6, and other fitness tests on June 7. The combine is not open to the public, though media attend.

Central Scouting directors McGuire and Marr both visited the NFL Scouting Combine to observe its use of physical and medical testing. Marr leads a committee with two general managers, two assistant general managers, and two scouting directors; the combine is also reviewed by a committee of teams' strength and conditioning coaches. From 1994 to 2014, the fitness testing was overseen by kinesiologist Norman Gledhill of York University.

=== Medical tests ===
Physical examinations are intended to detect persistent injuries, history of concussions, and cardiovascular issues such as cardiomyopathy. Echocardiograms, intended to identify hypertrophic cardiomyopathy, were introduced in 2009. Medical testing precedes fitness testing, and prospects must receive approval from the NHL Combine medical staff to participate in the latter. Prospects are also tested on hand–eye coordination.

In 2007, the combine began conducting psychological testing of prospects. This testing was administered by Exact Sports, which also directed fitness testing at some combines. Conducted on a computer in a supervised quiet room, the test took approximately an hour to complete. The first part was a personality test that evaluated traits such as mental toughness and coachability. The second part was a cognitive test, measuring "spatial awareness, decision speed, decision accuracy, concentration, and rates of mental fatigue." To allow for comparison of scores under different conditions, an abbreviated version of the cognitive test was administered immediately after prospects' fitness testing.

=== Fitness tests ===
==== Body composition ====
Prospects' height (barefoot) and wingspan (middle finger tip to middle finger tip) are measured to the nearest quarter inch. Body fat percentage is also measured using calipers. Weight is measured to the nearest 0.1 pound. The BodPod (an air displacement plethysmography system) measures body composition.

==== Grip strength ====
A hand-grip dynamometer tests the grip strength of both hands while the arm is fully extended.

==== Aerobic fitness (VO2 max) ====
Prospects' aerobic fitness is measured via VO2 max. Wearing a heart rate monitor and a mask to monitor oxygen utilization, the prospect must maintain a minimum number of revolutions per minute (RPM). Prospects are allowed to stand while pedaling. Resistance increases over the course of the test. The test concludes when the prospect fails to maintain the requisite RPM, or if the prospect experiences chest pain or difficulty breathing. After the test, prospects complete a two-minute cool-down, during which their heart rate recovery is monitored. Prospects may feel sick or vomit after the test.

==== Anaerobic fitness (Wingate test) ====
Prospects' anaerobic fitness is measured via the Wingate Cycle Ergometer Test, which is conducted on a stationary bicycle. Considered "one of the most notorious and feared tests of the combine", the Wingate test is intended to measure a prospect's "explosive" leg power and fatigue. Prospects receive strong verbal encouragement while completing the test. Prospects may feel sick or vomit after the test.

Prior to the 2018 combine, prospects had to cycle for 30 seconds with increasing resistance. Prospects would warm up for two minutes at low resistance, then sprint for 30 seconds with resistance of 7.5% or 9% of their body weight.

Beginning in 2018, the total testing period was 45 seconds: 10 seconds of cycling followed by alternating 5-second intervals of rest and cycling. The changed format was intended to better resemble a prospect's performance in an on-ice shift. The test is preceded by a two-minute warm-up period. Revolutions are recorded for the 5-second cycling intervals, and "power output is calculated for both the peak five second period and the 30 second duration"; this measurement method was also used prior to 2018. The resistance remains constant throughout the test. For the 2023 combine, resistance was set at 9% of the prospect's body weight.

==== Jumping ====
Prospects are measured on their horizontal and vertical jumping abilities.

In the standing long jump (also called the horizontal jump), prospects begin standing still and jump forward as far as they can. They are allowed to use their arms to assist the movement. The standing long jump was added in 1998.

A force plate measures a prospect's direction, strength, and timing during three jump types: a standard vertical jump with arm swing, a vertical jump with hands on hips, and a squat jump. Prospects are allowed three attempts for each jump type, and their highest jump is recorded. The test is intended to measure a prospect's ground reaction force. The force plate was introduced in 2015.

==== Bench press ====
Prospects bench press 50% of their body weight for three repetitions. Starting with arms fully extended, they lower the barbell to their chest, pause, and push it upward rapidly. The power (watts/kilogram) and velocity of each attempt is recorded using a linear positional transducer for velocity based training. The prospect's best score, measured in watts/kilogram, is reported.

The test's current format, measuring velocity at 50% body weight, began in 2018. The test was changed to give teams "more information to work with than just brute strength", according to Marr. In 2015, the test measured the maximum amount of repetitions at 70–80% of the prospect's body weight. Before that, the test measured the maximum amount of repetitions of a 150-pound bench press at a pace of 25 repetitions per minute.

==== Functional movement screen ====
The functional movement screen (FMS) was introduced to the combine in 2013. In the functional movement screen, prospects complete seven tests of their mobility and stability to determine functional limitations or asymmetries. The seven tests evaluate the prospects' deep squat, hurdle step, inline lunge, shoulder mobility, active straight leg raise, trunk stability pushup, and rotary stability. For each test, they receive a score, 0–3, which accumulates to a final score out of 21. Lower scores may indicate risk of future injury. In the 2013 combine, the mean total score was 15.2. The highest-scoring category was the trunk stability push-up, with 68% receiving a 3; the lowest-scoring category was the rotary stability task, with 1% receiving a 3.

Prospects may be unable to start or complete the FMS test due to acute musculoskeletal injury.

==== Agility (shuttle run) ====
Prospects complete two 5–10–5-yard shuttle runs—one to the left, and one to the right. Also called pro-agility, this test has been conducted since 2014. Prospects' agility was previously tested via the hexagon agility test, in which prospects hopped with feet together around a hexagon in each direction, and their completion time was recorded.

==== Pull-up ====
Maintaining correct technique, the prospects complete as many pull-ups as they can. Added in 2014, the test is intended to assess prospects' forearm and upper arm flexor muscular strength, endurance, and core stability.

==== Y-balance ====
The Y-balance test was added in 2015. In the test, which seeks to simulate a skating stride, the prospect stands on one leg and extends the other leg in three different directions. The test is intended to identify prospects who are "at greater risk for lower extremity injury".

=== Interviews ===
In addition to physical testing, prospects are interviewed by teams interested in them. Interviews take place in 15–20 minute blocks. Teams vary in their approach to interviews. Interviewers may include the general manager, scouts, advisors, and psychologists. Sometimes, the team's president or owner will participate. The NHL can provide interpreters for players who are not comfortable with their English-speaking abilities. Some players also take part in dinner meetings; teams usually take 3–4 players to dinner during the combine week. In 2018, the Detroit Red Wings took about 20 players to dinner.

According to Elite Prospects, interviews have increasingly been characterized by "custom psychological assessments, tailored interview strategies, and scripted hypotheticals designed to disarm rehearsed responses". Prospects are trained on how to answer questions, often by their agents. Interviews often include a set of general questions about the prospect's history, style of play, and personality. European players may be asked about their contract status in their home league. Prospects may be asked to analyze a video of their own game, or of the team's. Questions are usually centered around prospects' on-ice performance, and interviewers may try to ask difficult questions to see how players react when challenged. Interviews are also used to assess a prospect's character and ability to fit into the team's culture. Some teams, such as the Montreal Canadiens, have asked unusual questions like: "What kind of animal would you be?"

== Assessment outside of the combine ==
Prior to the combine, prospects may be interviewed by regional scouts or be asked to fill out questionnaires. Teams may ask prospects to complete personality assessment forms, and they may psychoanalyze prospects through these forms or via interviews run by psychologists. Psychological testing may also take place outside of the combine week. Daniel Tkaczuk reported that at his draft combine in 1997, some teams conducted extra physical testing, provided puzzles or IQ tests, and conducted personality tests, and one team conducted x-ray scans on him.

Prospects may be individually invited to interview further or conduct more fitness testing; these meetings may include skating, which is not part of the combine. Teams may also request additional medical information or psychological testing from prospects they are interested in.

In 2020, the Arizona Coyotes were forced to forfeit two draft picks—their 2020 second-round pick and their 2021 first-round pick—after violating NHL policy regarding physical assessment of draft-eligible players. The Coyotes had illegally conducted physical testing on draft-eligible players prior to the 2020 combine. The NHL does not allow teams to physically test prospects prior to the combine, though they may conduct psychological testing and interviews. After the 2019 NHL combine, The Hockey News reported that seven teams hosted their own assessment activities, which ranged from "merely scheduling more interviews" to "a full-blown schedule with medical tests, on-ice workouts and more physical challenges". In 2018 and 2022, the Montreal Canadiens hosted their own European combine for players not invited to the NHL combine.

== Research and reception ==
=== Evaluation of prospects based on combine performance ===
Scouts and executives may value perceived effort, rather than prospects' actual performance. Prospects may drop in rankings due to a lack of demonstrated "competitive drive" in fitness tests; some less-known prospects may benefit from good results that help them gain recognition. Jason Bukala, former scouting director for the Florida Panthers, said that fitness testing does not significantly impact prospects' rankings.

In the modern combine, interview performance is generally seen by teams as more consequential than fitness testing. According to Arizona Coyotes amateur scouting director Tim Bernhardt, some teams disproportionately value player interviews. Players with strong ties to the NHL (such as through an NHL-player father or uncle) may be more confident and therefore perform better in interviews.

=== Testing battery ===
The combine has been criticized for lack of on-ice tests by some researchers, fans, and scouts and general managers. E. J. McGuire and Dan Marr, each of whom have served as director of NHL Central Scouting, said that some prospects may be unfit for on-ice testing due to fatigue or injury from the recent IIHF World U18 Championship or Memorial Cup playoffs, and many top prospects have already been observed skating in-person or on video. Additionally, Marr said that there are logistical concerns for on-ice testing, including equipment, staffing, insurance, and scheduling issues. In 2019, Marr said that there was consensus among NHL teams that on-ice testing was not necessary for the combine. Marr stated, "There likely is not as much value in testing things like a player's shot or passing ability in a static environment compared with skating. There's also no great way to test a player's hockey sense, which is one of the primary attributes teams care about. All of those things are best observed in game situations."

Generally, researchers have found little or no correlation between off-ice testing and on-ice performance. Some off-ice tests, such as the Wingate test, have been shown by researchers to be of "limited use" in predicting on-ice performance. According to Elite Prospects, teams consider the agility test, the VO2 max test and the Wingate test to be the "best predictors of how swiftly a player would make it into the NHL and how well they would initially perform".

=== Predictive power ===
NHL players usually reach peak performance by their mid–late 20s, so teams must attempt to project the development of teenage prospects. Kinesiologist Norman Gledhill, who oversaw the combine's physical testing for about two decades, has conducted research with colleagues on the predictive power of fitness testing for hockey players. In an analysis of fitness testing at the 1994–2007 combines, they found that "VO2 max and peak leg power were the most common predictors of successfully transitioning to the NHL, getting playing time, and contributing offensively" for prospects' first seasons in the league. They also found that high upper body strength (as measured by push-ups, bench press repetitions, isometric push strength, and grip strength) is associated with lower career performance. The researchers also note that prospects in attendance at the combine do not represent a random sample; they are selected for their high performance.

=== Player position ===
Skaters and goaltenders are subject to the same tests at the combine. The testing of goaltenders receives relatively less attention than the testing of skaters; tests at the combine are not "specifically designed to assess actions usually performed by goaltenders". The relative importance of off-ice testing differs by prospect position; a 2008 study concluded that "emphasis on anthropometry should be used when comparing elite-level forwards, whereas peak anaerobic power and fatigue rate are more useful for differentiating between defense." A 2009 study created a composite index based on draft combine performance, finding that a score in the 90th percentile "is associated with 72% and 60% probability of playing in the NHL within 4 years after the draft for defensemen and forwards, respectively". A comparison of strength, power, and flexibility performance across multiple studies found that "forwards demonstrated a significantly better performance in all of the parameters followed by defenders, and finally, goaltenders, except for flexibility, which showed the reverse order". Goaltenders tend to have lower VO2 max results than skaters.

Measurements of body composition may be expected to vary by position. Forwards and goaltenders tend to have similar body mass, with defencemen being heavier. Defencemen are also slightly taller than forwards, and have a higher body mass index. Goaltenders have a higher body fat percentage than skaters; this "may be explained by the lower cardiovascular demands of this player position".
