= Calculation of buoyancy flows and flows inside buildings =

Buoyancy force is defined as the force exerted on a body or an object when inserted in a fluid. Buoyancy force is based on the basic principle of pressure variation with depth, since pressure increases with depth. Hence a buoyancy force arises as pressure on the bottom surface of the immersed object is greater than that at the top.

Flow problems in buildings were studied since 700 B.C. Recent advancements in CFD and CAE have led to comprehensive calculation of buoyancy flows and flows in buildings.

== Calculation of buoyant flows and flow inside buildings ==
Since there is natural driven ventilation resulting from the difference in temperature inside the buildings hence flows inside buildings fall under buoyancy force category. The momentum equation in the direction of gravity should be modeled for buoyant forces resulting from buoyancy. Hence the momentum equation is given by

∂ρv/∂t + V.∇(ρv)= -g((ρ-ρ°) - ∇P+μ∇^{2}v + S_{v}

In the above equation -g((ρ-ρ°) is the buoyancy term, where ρ° is the reference density.

On discretizing the above equation several instabilities are obtained during the solution process. Hence we use a transient approach as several relaxations are often required in obtaining a steady state solution.

When applied to turbulent flows some additional modifications are to be applied to the calculation of buoyant flows. Hence an additional term is added, as recommended by Rodi(1978) in the k equation of the k- ε model is used below in modelling turbulent buoyant flows. Therefore, the k-equations takes the form

∂ρk/∂t + ∇(ρku)= -g((ρ-ρ°) - ∇(τ∇×k) + G + B - ρε

Where

G= Usual Production or generation term = 2μE.E

B = Generation term related to buoyancy

Also B = βg_{i} (μ/σ) ∂T/∂xi

Where,

T = Temperature

gi = Gravitational acceleration in x-direction

β = Volumetric expansion coefficient = -(1/ρ) ∂ρ/∂T

Hence for turbulent kinetic energy the modeled transport equation is given as

∂ρε/∂t + ∇(ρεu) = ∇(τ∇×k) + C_{1}ε (ε/k)(G+B)(1+C_{3} R_{f} ) - C_{2} ε ρ(ε^{2}/k)

Where,

R_{f} = Flux Richardson number.

C_{3} = Additional model constant.

Flux Richardson number as defined by Hossain and Rodi (1976) is R_{f} = -B/G.

As C_{3} is close to unity in vertical buoyant shear layers and close zero in horizontal shear layers hence a single value of C_{3} cannot be used as R_{f}.

R_{f} = - G_{l}/2(G+B)

Where,

G_{l} = Buoyancy production in lateral energy component.

If we consider the horizontal shear layer where the lateral flow velocity component is in the direction of gravity, the production of buoyancy is given as

G_{l} = 2B

If we consider the vertical shear layer then the direction of gravity and the lateral component are normal to each other. Hence G_{l} = 0. Therefore, we obtain

R_{f} = - B/(B+G) ------------ For horizontal layers

R_{f} = 0 ------------- For vertical layers

Finally in a given flow if vertical shear stresses are dominant then we can set R_{f} equal to zero and take C_{3} = 0.8.

== Uses ==
Buoyancy flow calculation and force calculations are used in successfully predicting the effect of various natural calamities upon buildings, ships, aircraft and other commercial and non-commercial vehicles. They are also used in locating a prominent location for placing the exhaust chimney for the large scale industries. Also the shape of the chimney is obtained keeping in mind the above calculations. They are also used in planning of buildings in coastal area such that the structure is able to sustain floods and strong currents that arise at the coast.

== See also ==
- Air
- Archimedes paradox
- Buoy
- Brunt–Väisälä frequency
- Buoyancy compensator (diving)
- Buoyancy compensator (aviation)
- Cartesian diver
- Dasymeter
- Diving weighting system
- Fluid
- Hydrostatics
- Galileo thermometer
- Hull (watercraft)
- Hydrometer
- Hydrostatic weighing
- Lighter than air
- Naval architecture
- Plimsoll line
- Pontoon
- Quicksand
- Salt fingering
- Submarine
- Swim bladder
- Thrust
