= COSMED =

Italy-based medical technology corporation

- Type: Private
- Industry: Medical Technology
- Founded: 1980
- Headquarters: Rome Italy
- Area served: Worldwide
- Products: Medical devices Clinical services
- Number of employees: 200 (2023)
- Website: cosmed.com

COSMED is a privately held, international, medical technology corporation specialized in Metabolic and Cardio Pulmonary diagnostic testing equipment aimed for either professional or medical use in different application fields (Hospital, Sports Science, Health care, Professional sports and Wellness).

== History ==
Founded in 1980 and based in Rome, Italy, COSMED started manufacturing portable spirometers and pulmonary function testing equipment. In the nineties, the company introduced new systems for gas exchange measurements and patented the first portable system with telemetric data transmission for the measurement of metabolic parameters during field-testing.

During early 2000 COSMED started to expand international business incorporating subsidiaries and registered offices in several countries (USA, China, Germany, UK).

In 2011, COSMED USA, Inc. completed the acquisition of US company Life Measurement, Inc. (LMI), a provider of body composition assessment equipment based on Air Displacement Plethysmography technology.

== Products ==
COSMED manufactures a full range of spirometers, Pulmonary Function Test (PFT), Cardio Pulmonary Exercise Test (CPET), and Indirect Calorimetry diagnostic equipment.

Since 2011, with the acquisition of Life Measurement Inc. (LMI), COSMED also manufactures body composition assessment equipment for infants, children and adults.

COSMED main brands include: BOD POD, PEA POD, K4b2, K5, Fitmate, Quark RMR, Quark CPET, Quark PFT, Q-NRG, Pony FX, microQuark, Spiropalm, OMNIA.

== Appearances ==
COSMED products were selected to outfit the physiology assessment laboratory in the 23rd James Bond film Skyfall. COSMED products were used on-screen by the MI6 medical staff to assess James Bond’s cardio respiratory performance and fitness level.

== Awards ==
COSMED product Spiropalm 6MWT handheld spirometer won the 2013 Product of Outstanding Interest (POINT) Award from the European Respiratory Society (ERS) during the ERS Congress in Barcelona (Spain).

The Q-NRG, a portable indirect calorimeter, won the iF Design Award for 2021 in the Medicine/Health category.
