= Displacement (ship) =

Ship's weight

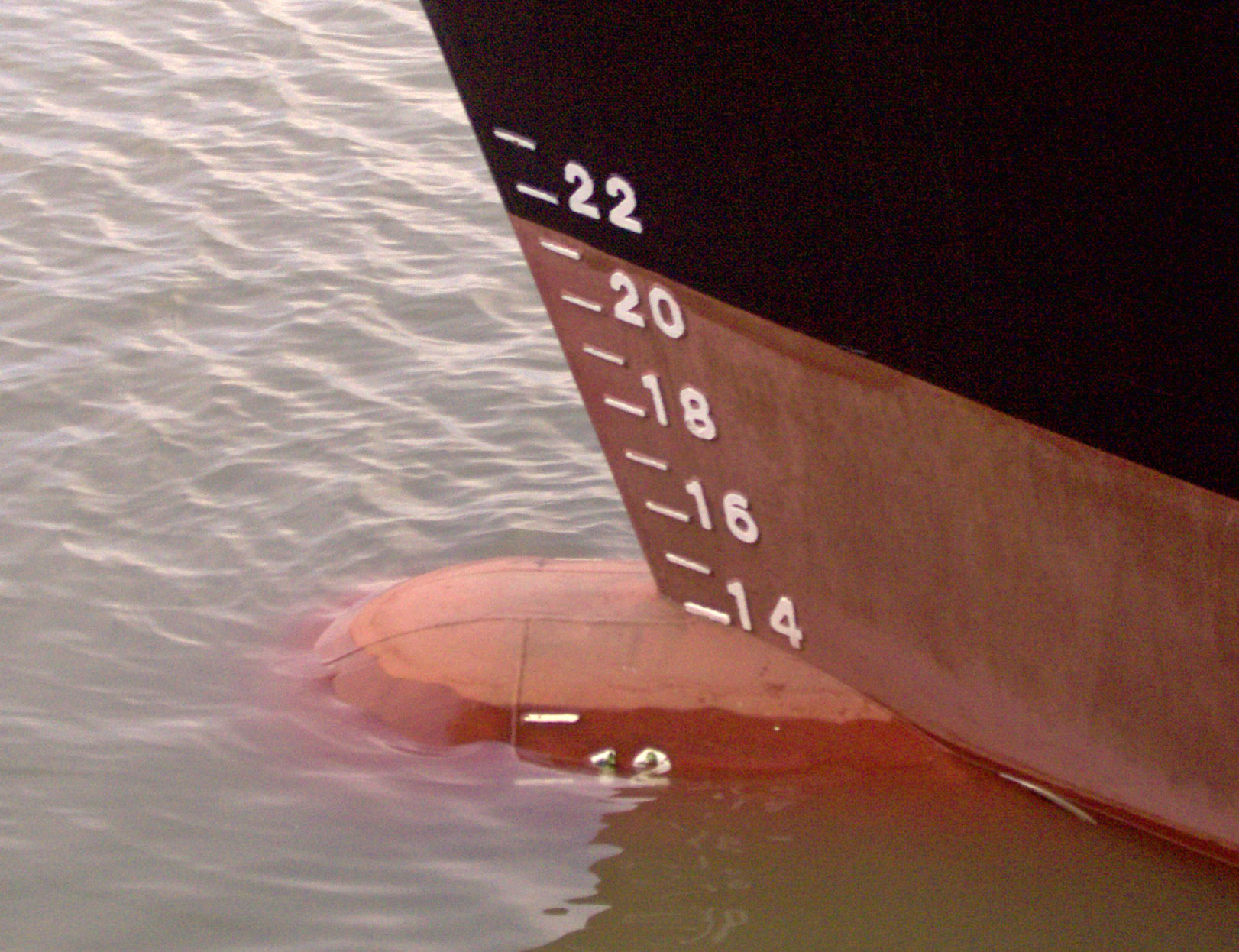
Draft marks, by showing how low a ship is sitting in the water, make it possible to determine displacement.

The displacement or displacement tonnage of a ship is its weight. As the term indicates, it is measured indirectly, using Archimedes' principle, by first calculating the volume of water displaced by the ship, then converting that value into weight. Traditionally, various measurement rules have been in use, giving various measures in long tons. Today, tonnes are more commonly used.

Ship displacement varies by a vessel's degree of load, from its empty weight as designed (known as "lightweight tonnage") to its maximum load. Numerous specific terms are used to describe varying levels of load and trim, detailed below.

Ship displacement should not be confused with measurements of volume or capacity typically used for commercial vessels and measured by tonnage: net tonnage and gross tonnage.

== Calculation ==
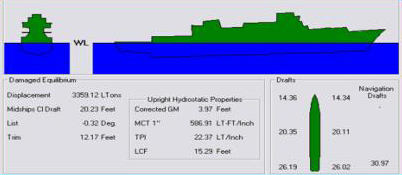
Shipboard stability computer programs can be used to calculate a vessel's displacement.

The process of determining a vessel's displacement begins with measuring its draft. This is accomplished by means of its "draft marks". A merchant vessel has three matching sets: one mark each on the port and starboard sides forward, midships, and astern. These marks allow a ship's displacement to be determined to an accuracy of 0.5%.

The draft observed at each set of marks is averaged to find a mean draft. The ship's hydrostatic tables show the corresponding volume displaced. To calculate the weight of the displaced water, it is necessary to know its density. Seawater (1,025 kg/m^{3}) is more dense than fresh water (1,000 kg/m^{3}); so a ship will ride higher in salt water than in fresh. The density of water also varies with temperature.

Devices akin to slide rules have been available since the 1950s to aid in these calculations. Presently, it is done with computers.

Displacement is usually measured in units of tonnes or long tons.

== Definitions ==
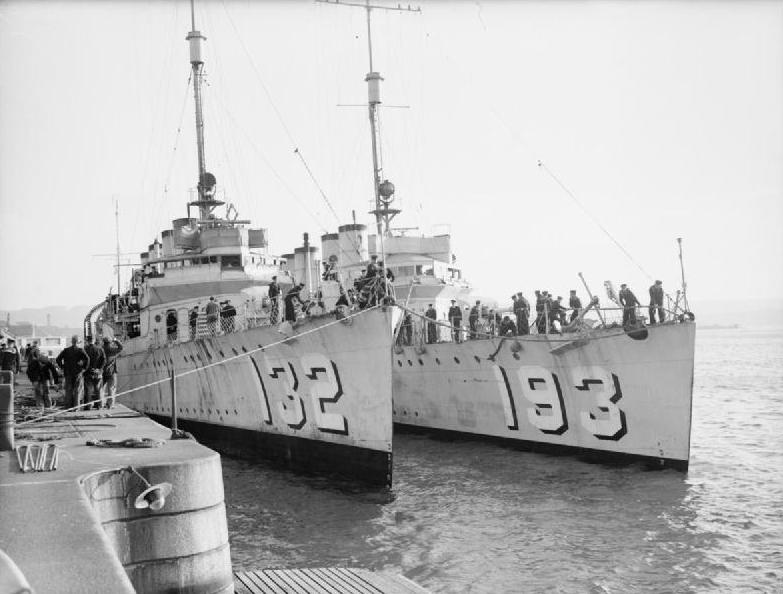
In this 1940 photo, USS Aaron Ward, left, and USS Abel P. Upshur are destroyers of comparable size, but because the latter is more heavily loaded, it sits lower, displacing more water.

There are terms for the displacement of a vessel under specified conditions:

=== Loaded displacement ===
- Loaded displacement is the weight of the ship including cargo, passengers, fuel, water, stores, dunnage and such other items necessary for use on a voyage. These bring the ship down to its "load draft".
- Full load displacement and loaded displacement have almost identical definitions. Full load is defined as the displacement of a vessel when floating at its greatest allowable draft as approved by the load line assigning authority which is either the flag state (United States Coast Guard, etc.) or a classification society (and designated by its "load line"). Warships have full load condition established through the Naval design process, and are exempt from commercial requirements laid out by flag state laws.

=== Light displacement ===
- Light displacement (LDT) is defined as the weight of the ship excluding cargo, fuel, water, ballast, stores, passengers, crew, but with water in boilers to steaming level.

=== Normal displacement ===
- Normal displacement is the ship's displacement "with all outfit, and two-thirds supply of stores, ammunition, etc., on board."

=== Standard displacement ===
- Standard displacement, also known as "Washington displacement", is a specific term defined by the Washington Naval Treaty of 1922. "It is the displacement of the ship complete, fully manned, engined, and equipped ready for sea, including all armament and ammunition, equipment, outfit, provisions and fresh water for crew, miscellaneous stores, and implements of every description that are intended to be carried in war, but without fuel or reserve boiler feed water on board."

== Gallery ==
A floating ship's displacement F_{p} and buoyancy F_{b} must be equal.

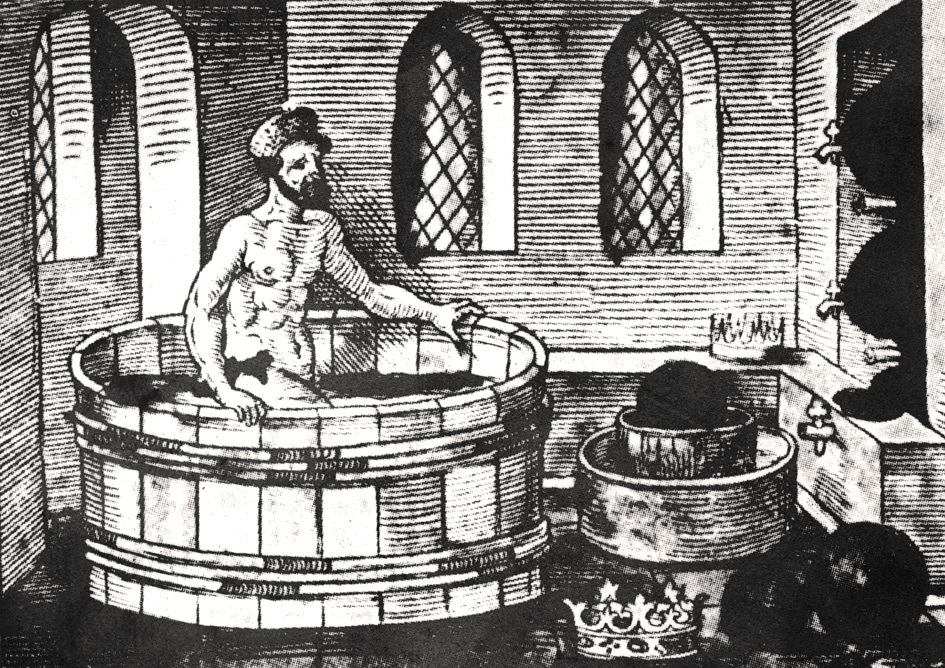
Greek philosopher Archimedes having his famous bath, the birth of the theory of displacement

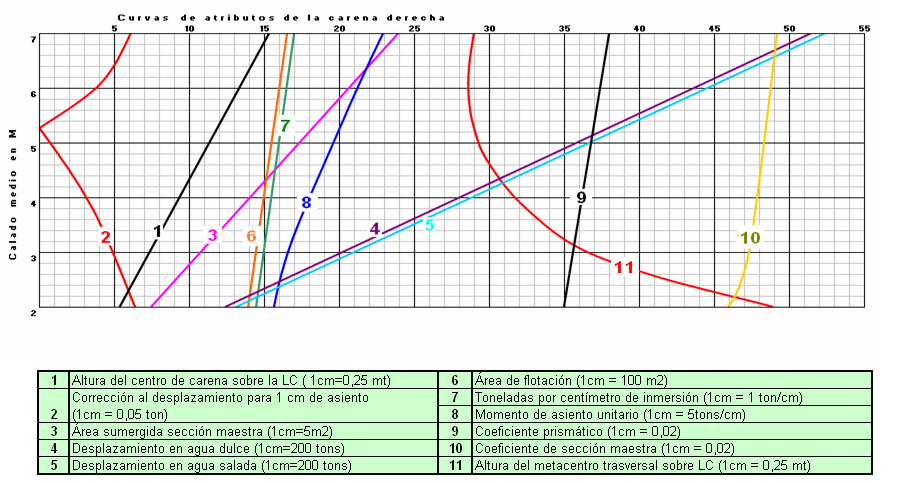
A ship's hydrostatic curves. Lines 4 and 5 are used to convert from mean draft in meters to displacement in tonnes (table in Spanish).

== See also ==
- Naval architecture
- Hull (watercraft)
- Hydrodynamics
- Tonnage
