= On Floating Bodies =

Treatise on hydrostatics by Archimedes

On Floating Bodies I-II
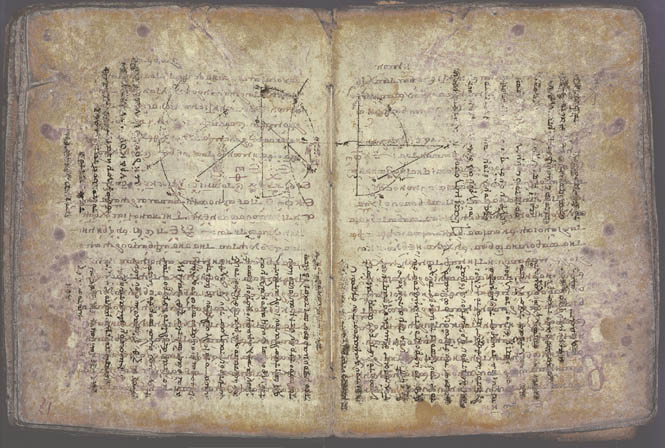
- Author: Archimedes
- Language: Ancient Greek
- Genre: Hydrostatics

On Floating Bodies (Greek: Περὶ τῶν ἐπιπλεόντων σωμάτων) is a work, originally in two books, by Archimedes, one of the most important mathematicians, physicists, and engineers of antiquity. Thought to have been written towards the end of Archimedes' life, On Floating Bodies I-II survives only partly in Greek and in a medieval Latin translation from the Greek. It is the first known work on hydrostatics, of which Archimedes is recognized as the founder.

The purpose of On Floating Bodies I-II was to determine the positions that various solids will assume when floating in a fluid, according to their form and the variation in their specific gravities. The work is known for containing the first statement of what is now known as Archimedes' principle.

== Overview ==
Archimedes lived in the Greek city-state of Syracuse, Sicily, where he was known as a mathematician and as a designer of machines, some of which might have helped keeping Roman armies at bay during the Second Punic War. Archimedes' interests in the conditions of stability for solid bodies are found both here and in his studies of the lever and centre of gravity in On the Equilibrium of Planes I-II.

Book one of On Floating Bodies begins with a derivation of the Law of Buoyancy and ends with a proof that a floating segment of a homogeneous solid sphere is always in stable equilibrium when its base is parallel to the surface of a fluid. Book two extends Archimedes' study from the segment of a sphere to the case of a right paraboloid and contains many sophisticated results.

Although the work is extant in Latin translation, the only known copy of On Floating Bodies I-II in Greek comes from the Archimedes Palimpsest.

== Contents ==
=== First book ===
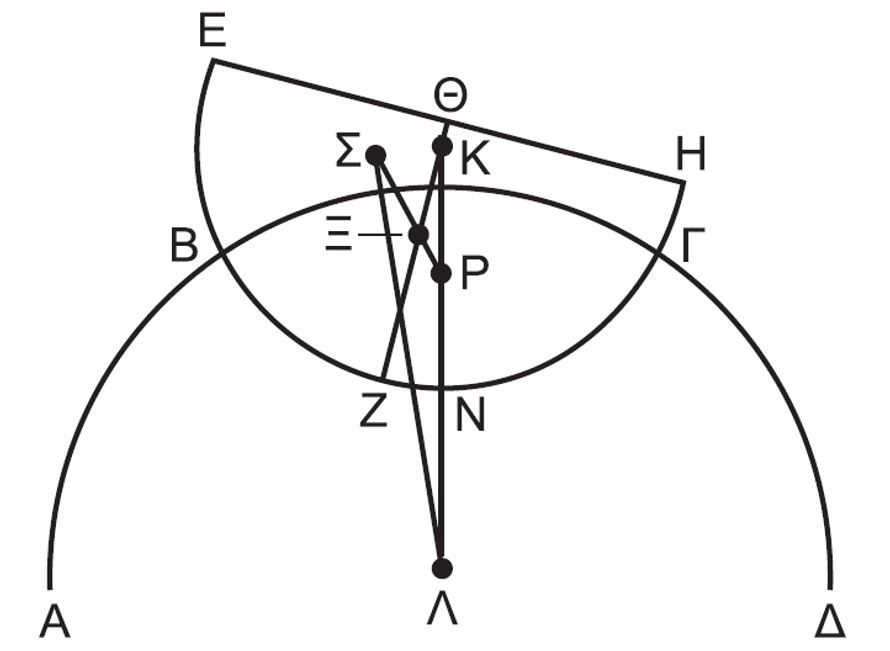
Diagram illustrating Proposition 8 of On Floating Bodies I.

In the first part of book one, Archimedes establishes various general principles, such as that a solid less dense than a fluid will, when immersed in that fluid, be lighter (the "missing" weight found in the fluid it displaces). Archimedes spells out the law of equilibrium of fluids, and proves that water will adopt a spherical form around a centre of gravity. This may have been a reference to contemporary Greek theory that the Earth is round, which is also found in the works of others such as Eratosthenes. The fluids described by Archimedes are not self-gravitating, since he assumes the existence of a point towards which all things fall in order to derive the spherical shape. Most notably, On Floating Bodies I contains the concept which became known as Archimedes' principle:

Any body wholly or partially immersed in a fluid experiences an upward force (buoyancy) equal to the weight of the fluid displaced

In addition to the principle that bears his name, Archimedes discovered that a submerged object displaces a volume of water equal to the object's own volume (upon which the story of him shouting "Eureka" is based). This concept has come to be referred to by some as the principle of flotation.

=== Second book ===
Book two of On Floating Bodies is considered a mathematical achievement unmatched in antiquity and rarely equaled until after the late Renaissance. Thomas Heath called it "a veritable tour de force which must be read in full to be appreciated." The book contains a detailed investigation of the stable equilibrium positions of floating right paraboloids of various shapes and relative densities when floating in a fluid of greater specific gravity, according to geometric and hydrostatic variations. It is restricted to the case when the base of the paraboloid lies either entirely above or entirely below the fluid surface.

Archimedes' investigation of paraboloids was possibly an idealization of the shapes of ships' hulls. Some of the paraboloids float with the base under water and the summit above water, similar to the way that icebergs float. Of Archimedes' works that survive, the second book of On Floating Bodies is considered his most mature work.
