= Bahram H. Arjmandi =

American nutritionist

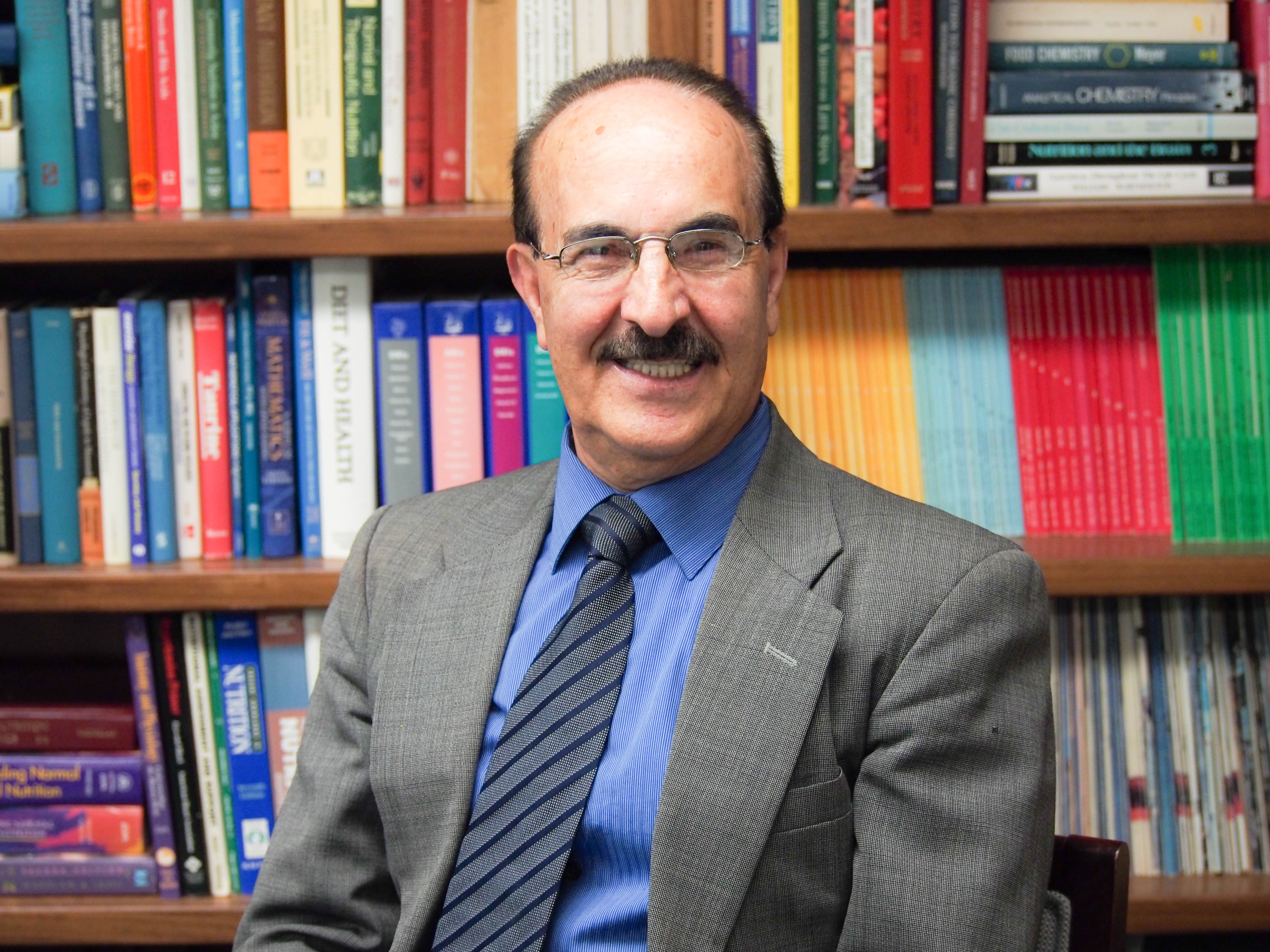
- Born: Karaj, Iran
- Education: Kansas State University; University of Texas Health Science Center
- Known for: Nutrition, Food science, Osteoporosis, Osteoarthritis
- Scientific career
- Fields: Nutrition
- Workplaces: Florida State University

Bahram H. Arjmandi is an American nutritionist. He is the Margaret A. Sitton Professor at Florida State University (FSU) and is the founder and Director of the Center for Advancing Exercise and Nutrition Research on Aging (CAENRA). He is a researcher in the fields of functional foods and human health. He was among the first to detect the presence of estrogen receptors in the gut linking the importance of estrogen and estrogen receptors in calcium regulation independent of vitamin D.

Arjmandi is a widely published and cited researcher in the fields of nutrition and human health.

His current research emphasis is women's health including cardiovascular health, osteoporosis, and osteoarthritis.

== Early life ==
Arjmandi received his Ph.D. From Kansas State University, where he studied the effect of soluble fiber on sterol synthesis and later completed his postdoctoral work in the area of estrogen and bone physiology at the University of Texas Health Science Center.

== Selected publications ==
- Bone metabolic abnormalities associated with well-controlled type 1 diabetes (IDDM) in young adult women: a disease complication often ignored or neglected. J Am Coll Nutr. 2010 Aug; 29 :419–29.
- Effects of watermelon supplementation on aortic blood pressure and wave reflection in individuals with prehypertension: A Pilot Study. Am J Hypertens. 2010 Jul 8.
- One year soy protein supplementation does not improve lipid profile in postmenopausal women. Menopause 2010 Mar 3.
- Combination of fructooligosaccharide and dried plum has the best bone reversal properties among select functional foods and bioactive compounds. J Food and Medicine. 2010 Feb 4.
- Combination of genistin and fructooligosaccharides prevents bone loss in ovarian hormone deficiency. J Med Food. 2010 Feb 4.
- Dual energy x-ray absorptiometry (DXA) as a non-invasive tool for the prediction of bone density and body composition of turtles. Herpetological Review, 41, 36–42, 2010.
- Vitamin E dose-dependently reduces aortic fatty lesion formation in orchidectomized aged rats. Aging Clin Exp Res. 2009 Dec 18.
- Viewpoint: Dried plum, an emerging functional food that may effectively improve bone health. Ageing Res Rev. 8(2):122–7, 2009.
- The role of vitamin E in reversing bone loss. Aging Clin Exp Res. 20(6):521–7, 2008.
- Addition of Fructooligosaccharides and Dried Plum to Soy-based Diets Reverses Bone Loss in the Ovariectomized Rat. Evid Based Complement Alternat Med. 2008 Jul 30.
- The combination of genistin and ipriflavone prevents mammary tumorigenesis and modulates lipid profile. Clin Nutr. 27(4):643–8, 2008.
- Dietary l-carnitine supplementation improves bone mineral density by suppressing bone turnover in aged ovariectomized rats. Phytomedicine. 15(8):595–601, 2008.
- Blueberry prevents bone loss in ovariectomized rat model of postmenopausal osteoporosis. J Nutr Bioch, 19(10):694–9, 2008.
- Flaxseed Reduces LDL- and Total-Cholesterol Concentrations in Native American Postmenopausal Women. J Women's Health Gend, 17:355–366, 2008.
- High impact exercise and dietary calcium both benefit the skeleton in growing rats or High impact exercise can overcome a moderate calcium deficiency in the growing rat skeleton. Bone, 42:660–668, 2008.
