= Dasymeter =

Device used to measure to density of gases

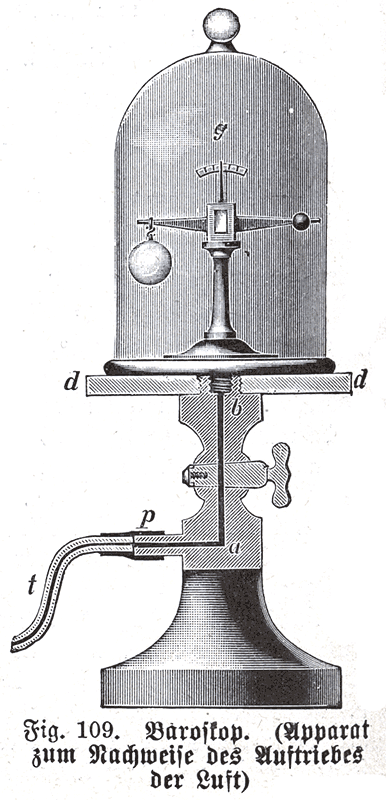
Historical drawing of a dasymeter (in German: "Fig. 109. Baroscope. (Apparatus for proving the buoyancy of air)")

A dasymeter is a device that acts as a densimeter used to measure the density of gases. It consists of a thin sphere made of glass, ideally with an average density close to that of the gas to be investigated. This sphere is immersed in the gas and weighed. The dasymeter was initially intended to be a device to demonstrate the buoyant effect of gases like air.

== Principle ==
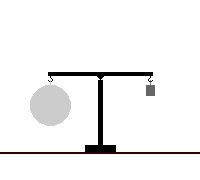
Dasymeter at standard pressure

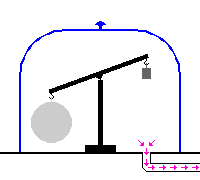
Dasymeter at reduced pressure

The Principle of Archimedes permits to derive a formula which does not rely on any volumetric information: a sample, the big sphere in the adjacent images, of known mass-density is weighed in vacuum and then immersed into the gas and weighed again.

$$\frac { \text{density of sphere}} { \text {density of gas} } = \frac { \text{weight of sphere}} { \text{weight of sphere} - \text{weight of immersed sphere}}\,$$

(The above formula was taken from the article buoyancy and still has to be solved for the density of the gas.)

From the known mass density of the sample (sphere) and its two weight-values, the mass-density of the gas can be calculated as:

$${ \text {density of gas} } = \frac { \text{weight of sphere} - \text{weight of immersed sphere}} { \text{weight of sphere}} \times {\text{density of sphere}}$$

== History ==
The dasymeter was invented in 1650 by Otto von Guericke.

Archimedes used a pair of scales which he immersed into water to demonstrate the buoyant effect of water. A dasymeter can be seen as a variant of that pair of scales, only immersed into gas rather than liquid.

== See also ==
- Calculation of buoyancy flows and flows inside buildings
- Hydrostatic weighing
- Laboratory glassware
