= Displacement (fluid) =

Fluid displaced when an object is immersed in it

Measurement of volume by displacement, (a) before and (b) after an object has been submerged. The amount by which the liquid rises in the cylinder (∆V) is equal to the volume of the object.

In fluid mechanics, displacement occurs when an object is largely immersed in a fluid, pushing it out of the way and taking its place. The volume of the fluid displaced can then be measured, and from this, the volume of the immersed object can be deduced: the volume of the immersed object will be exactly equal to the volume of the displaced fluid.

An object immersed in a liquid displaces an amount of fluid equal to the object's volume. Thus, buoyancy is expressed through Archimedes' principle, which states that the weight of the object is reduced by its volume multiplied by the density of the fluid. If the weight of the object is less than this displaced quantity, the object floats; if more, it sinks. The amount of fluid displaced is directly related (via Archimedes' principle) to its volume. In the case of an object that sinks (is totally submerged), the volume of the object is displaced. In the case of an object that floats, the weight of fluid displaced will be equal to the weight of the displacing object.

== Applications of displacement ==
This method can be used to measure the volume of a solid object, even if its form is not regular. Several methods of such measuring exist. In one case the increase of liquid level is registered as the object is immersed in the liquid (usually water). In the second case, the object is immersed into a vessel full of liquid (called an overflow can), causing it to overflow. Then the spilled liquid is collected and its volume measured. In the third case, the object is suspended under the surface of the liquid and the increase of weight of the vessel is measured. The increase in weight is equal to the amount of liquid displaced by the object, which is the same as the volume of the suspended object times the density of the liquid.

The concept of Archimedes' principle is that an object immersed in a fluid is buoyed up by a force equal to the weight of the fluid displaced by the object. The weight of the displaced fluid can be found mathematically. The mass of the displaced fluid can be expressed in terms of the density and its volume, m = ρV. The fluid displaced has a weight W = mg, where g is acceleration due to gravity. Therefore, the weight of the displaced fluid can be expressed as W = ρVg.

The weight of an object or substance can be measured by floating a sufficiently buoyant receptacle in the cylinder and noting the water level. After placing the object or substance in the receptacle, the difference in weight of the water level volumes will equal the weight of the object.

== See also ==
- Displacement (ship)
