= Archimedes' principle =

Buoyancy principle in fluid dynamics

Archimedes' principle states that the upward buoyant force that is exerted on a body immersed in a fluid, whether fully or partially, is equal to the weight of the fluid that the body displaces. Archimedes' principle is a law of physics fundamental to fluid mechanics. It was formulated by Archimedes of Syracuse.

== Explanation ==
In On Floating Bodies, Archimedes suggested that (c. 246 BC):

Any object, totally or partially immersed in a fluid or liquid, is buoyed up by a force equal to the weight of the fluid displaced by the object.

Archimedes' principle allows the buoyancy of any floating object partially or fully immersed in a fluid to be calculated. The downward force on the object is simply its weight. The upward, or buoyant, force on the object is that stated by Archimedes' principle above. Thus, the net force on the object is the difference between the magnitudes of the buoyant force and its weight. If this net force is positive, the object rises; if negative, the object sinks; and if zero, the object is neutrally buoyant—that is, it remains in place without either rising or sinking. In simple words, Archimedes' principle states that, when a body is partially or completely immersed in a fluid, it experiences an apparent loss in weight that is equal to the weight of the fluid displaced by the immersed part of the body(s).

== Formula ==
A floating object's weight F_{p} and its buoyancy F_{a} (F_{b} in the text of the image) must be equal in size.

Consider a cuboid immersed in a fluid, its top and bottom faces orthogonal to the direction of gravity (assumed constant across the cube's stretch). The fluid will exert a normal force on each face, but only the normal forces on top and bottom will contribute to buoyancy. The pressure difference between the bottom and the top face is directly proportional to the height (difference in depth of submersion). Multiplying the pressure difference by the area of a face gives a net force on the cuboid—the buoyancy—equaling in magnitude the weight of the fluid displaced by the cuboid. By summing up sufficiently many arbitrarily small cuboids this reasoning may be extended to irregular shapes, and so, whatever the shape of the submerged body, the buoyant force is equal to the weight of the displaced fluid.

$$\text{ weight of displaced fluid} = \text{weight of object in vacuum} - \text{apparent weight of object in fluid}\,$$

The weight of the displaced fluid is directly proportional to the volume of the displaced fluid (if the surrounding fluid is of uniform density). The apparent weight of the object in the fluid is reduced, because of the force acting on it, which is called upthrust. In simple terms, the principle states that the buoyant force (F_{b}) on an object is equal to the weight of the fluid displaced by the object, or the density (ρ) of the fluid multiplied by the submerged volume (V) times the gravity (g)

We can express this relation in the equation:

$$F_{a} = \rho g V$$

where $F_{a}$ denotes the buoyant force applied onto the submerged object, $\rho$ denotes the density of the fluid, $V$ represents the volume of the displaced fluid and $g$ is the acceleration due to gravity. Thus, among completely submerged objects with equal masses, objects with greater volume have greater buoyancy.

Suppose a rock's weight is measured as 10 newtons when suspended by a string in a vacuum with gravity acting on it. Suppose that, when the rock is lowered into the water, it displaces water of weight 3 newtons. The force it then exerts on the string from which it hangs would be 10 newtons minus the 3 newtons of buoyant force: 10 − 3 = 7 newtons. Buoyancy reduces the apparent weight of an object. It is generally easier to lift an object through the water than it is to pull it out of the water.

For a fully submerged object, Archimedes' principle can be reformulated as follows:

$$\text{apparent immersed weight} = \text{weight of object} - \text{weight of displaced fluid}\,$$

then inserted into the quotient of weights, which has been expanded by the mutual volume

$$\frac { \text{density of object}} { \text{density of fluid} } = \frac { \text{weight of object}} { \text{weight of displaced fluid} }$$

yields the formula below. The density of the immersed object relative to the density of the fluid can easily be calculated without measuring any volume is

$$\frac { \text {density of object}} { \text{density of fluid} } = \frac { \text{weight of object}} { \text{weight of object} - \text{apparent immersed weight}}.\,$$

(This formula is used for example in describing the measuring principle of a dasymeter and of hydrostatic weighing.)

Example: If you drop wood into water, buoyancy will keep it afloat.

Example: A helium balloon in a moving car. When increasing speed or driving in a curve, the air moves in the opposite direction to the car's acceleration. However, due to buoyancy, the balloon is pushed "out of the way" by the air and will drift in the same direction as the car's acceleration.

When an object is immersed in a liquid, the liquid exerts an upward force, which is known as the buoyant force, that is proportional to the weight of the displaced liquid. Consequently, the net force acting on the object is equal to the difference between the weight of the object, or 'down' force, and the weight of the displaced fluid, or 'up' force. Equilibrium, or neutral buoyancy, is achieved when these two weights and thus forces are equal.

== Forces and equilibrium ==
The equation to calculate the pressure inside a fluid in equilibrium is:

$$\mathbf{f}+\operatorname{div}\,\sigma=0$$

where f is the force density exerted by some outer field on the fluid, and σ is the Cauchy stress tensor. In this case the stress tensor is proportional to the identity tensor:

$$\sigma_{ij}=-p\delta_{ij}.\,$$

Here δ_{ij} is the Kronecker delta. Using this the above equation becomes:

$$\mathbf{f}=\nabla p.\,$$

Assuming the outer force field is conservative, that is it can be written as the negative gradient of some scalar valued function:

$$\mathbf{f}=-\nabla\Phi.\,$$

Then:

$$\nabla(p+\Phi)=0 \Longrightarrow p+\Phi = \text{constant}.\,$$

Therefore, the shape of the open surface of a fluid equals the equipotential plane of the applied outer conservative force field. Let the z-axis point downward. In this case the field is gravity, so Φ = −ρ_{f}gz where g is the gravitational acceleration, ρ_{f} is the mass density of the fluid. Taking the pressure as zero at the surface, where z is zero, the constant will be zero, so the pressure inside the fluid, when it is subject to gravity, is

$$p=\rho_f g z.\,$$

So pressure increases with depth below the surface of a liquid, as z denotes the distance from the surface of the liquid into it. Any object with a non-zero vertical depth will have different pressures on its top and bottom, with the pressure on the bottom being greater. This difference in pressure causes the upward buoyancy force.

The buoyancy force exerted on a body can now be calculated easily, since the internal pressure of the fluid is known. The force exerted on the body can be calculated by integrating the stress tensor over the surface of the body which is in contact with the fluid:

$$\mathbf{B}=\oint \sigma \, d\mathbf{A}.$$

The surface integral can be transformed into a volume integral with the help of the Gauss theorem:

$$\mathbf{B}=\int \operatorname{div}\sigma \, dV = -\int \mathbf{f}\, dV = -\rho_f \mathbf{g} \int\,dV=-\rho_f \mathbf{g} V$$

where V is the measure of the volume in contact with the fluid, that is the volume of the submerged part of the body, since the fluid doesn't exert force on the part of the body which is outside of it.

The magnitude of buoyancy force may be appreciated a bit more from the following argument. Consider any object of arbitrary shape and volume V surrounded by a liquid. The force the liquid exerts on an object within the liquid is equal to the weight of the liquid with a volume equal to that of the object. This force is applied in a direction opposite to gravitational force, that is of magnitude:

$$B = \rho_f V_\text{disp}\, g, \,$$

where ρ_{f} is the density of the fluid, V_{disp} is the volume of the displaced body of liquid, and g is the gravitational acceleration at the location in question.

If this volume of liquid is replaced by a solid body of exactly the same shape, the force the liquid exerts on it must be exactly the same as above. In other words, the "buoyancy force" on a submerged body is directed in the opposite direction to gravity and is equal in magnitude to

$$B = \rho_f V g. \,$$

The net force on the object must be zero if it is to be a situation of fluid statics such that Archimedes principle is applicable, and is thus the sum of the buoyancy force and the object's weight

$$F_\text{net} = 0 = m g - \rho_f V_\text{disp} g \,$$

If the buoyancy of an (unrestrained and unpowered) object exceeds its weight, it tends to rise. An object whose weight exceeds its buoyancy tends to sink. Calculation of the upwards force on a submerged object during its accelerating period cannot be done by the Archimedes principle alone; it is necessary to consider dynamics of an object involving buoyancy. Once it fully sinks to the floor of the fluid or rises to the surface and settles, Archimedes principle can be applied alone. For a floating object, only the submerged volume displaces water. For a sunken object, the entire volume displaces water, and there will be an additional force of reaction from the solid floor.

In order for Archimedes' principle to be used alone, the object in question must be in equilibrium (the sum of the forces on the object must be zero), therefore;

$$mg = \rho_f V_\text{disp} g, \,$$

and therefore

$$m = \rho_f V_\text{disp}.  \,$$

showing that the depth to which a floating object will sink, and the volume of fluid it will displace, is independent of the gravitational field regardless of geographic location.

(Note: If the fluid in question is seawater, it will not have the same density (ρ) at every location. For this reason, a ship may display a Plimsoll line.)

It can be the case that forces other than just buoyancy and gravity come into play. This is the case if the object is restrained or if the object sinks to the solid floor. An object which tends to float requires a tension restraint force T in order to remain fully submerged. An object which tends to sink will eventually have a normal force of constraint N exerted upon it by the solid floor. The constraint force can be tension in a spring scale measuring its weight in the fluid, and is how apparent weight is defined.

If the object would otherwise float, the tension to restrain it fully submerged is:

$$T = \rho_f V g - m g . \,$$

When a sinking object settles on the solid floor, it experiences a normal force of:

$$N = m g - \rho_f V g . \,$$

Another possible formula for calculating buoyancy of an object is by finding the apparent weight of that particular object in the air (calculated in Newtons), and apparent weight of that object in the water (in Newtons). To find the force of buoyancy acting on the object when in air, using this particular information, this formula applies:

Buoyancy force = weight of object in empty space − weight of object immersed in fluid

The final result would be measured in Newtons.

Air's density is very small compared to most solids and liquids. For this reason, the weight of an object in air is approximately the same as its true weight in a vacuum. The buoyancy of air is neglected for most objects during a measurement in air because the error is usually insignificant (typically less than 0.1% except for objects of very low average density such as a balloon or light foam).

=== Simplified model ===
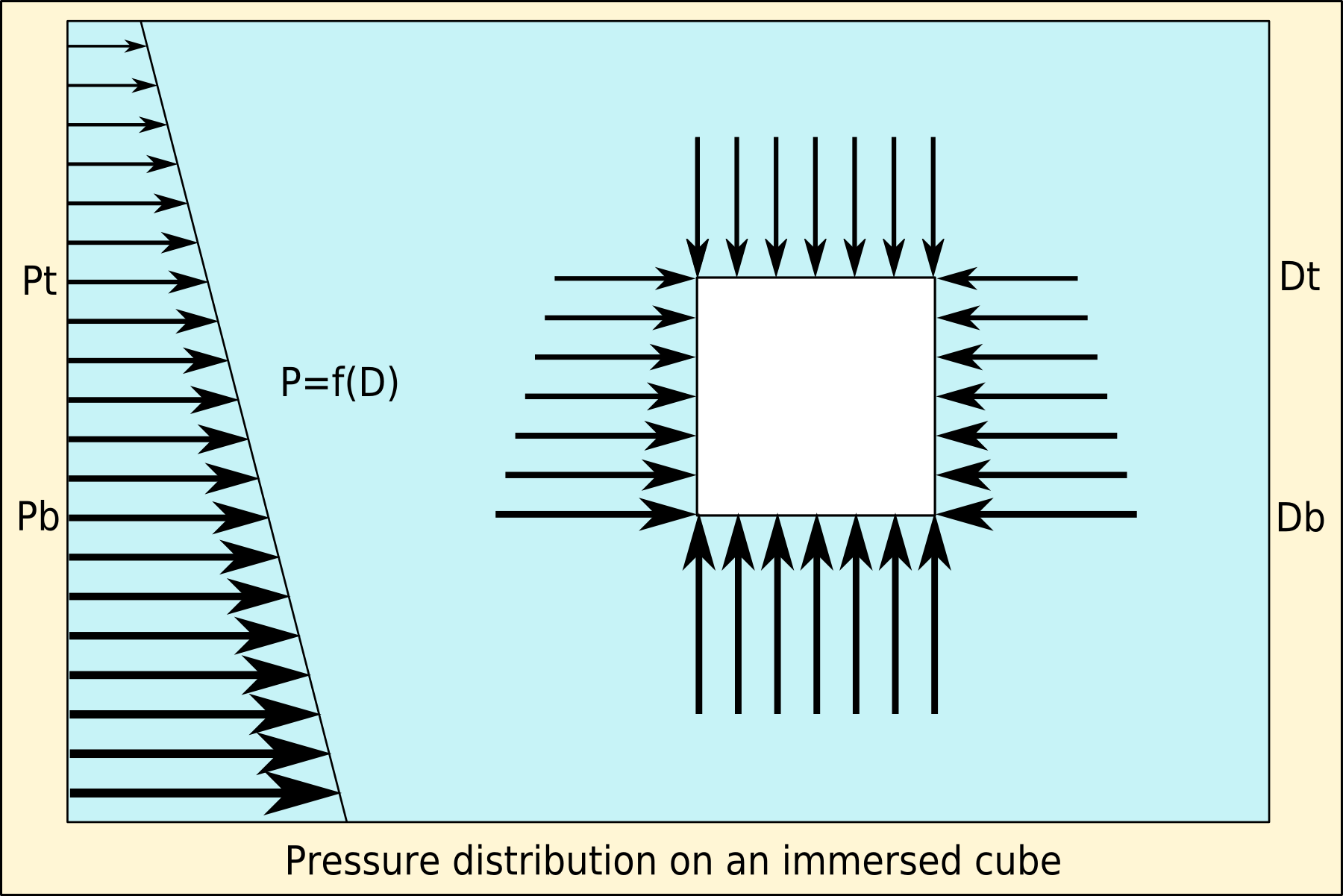
Pressure distribution on an immersed cube

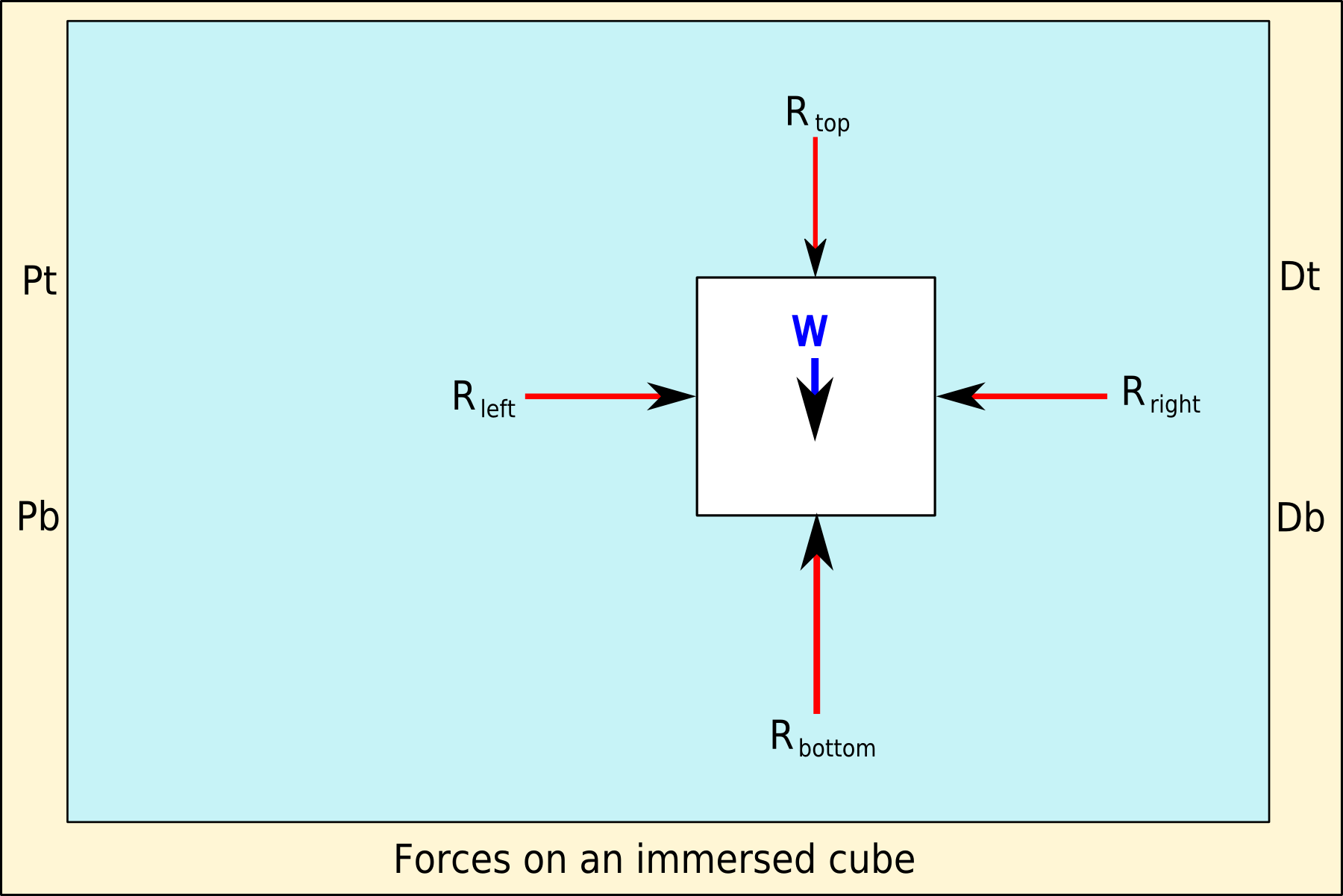
Forces on an immersed cube

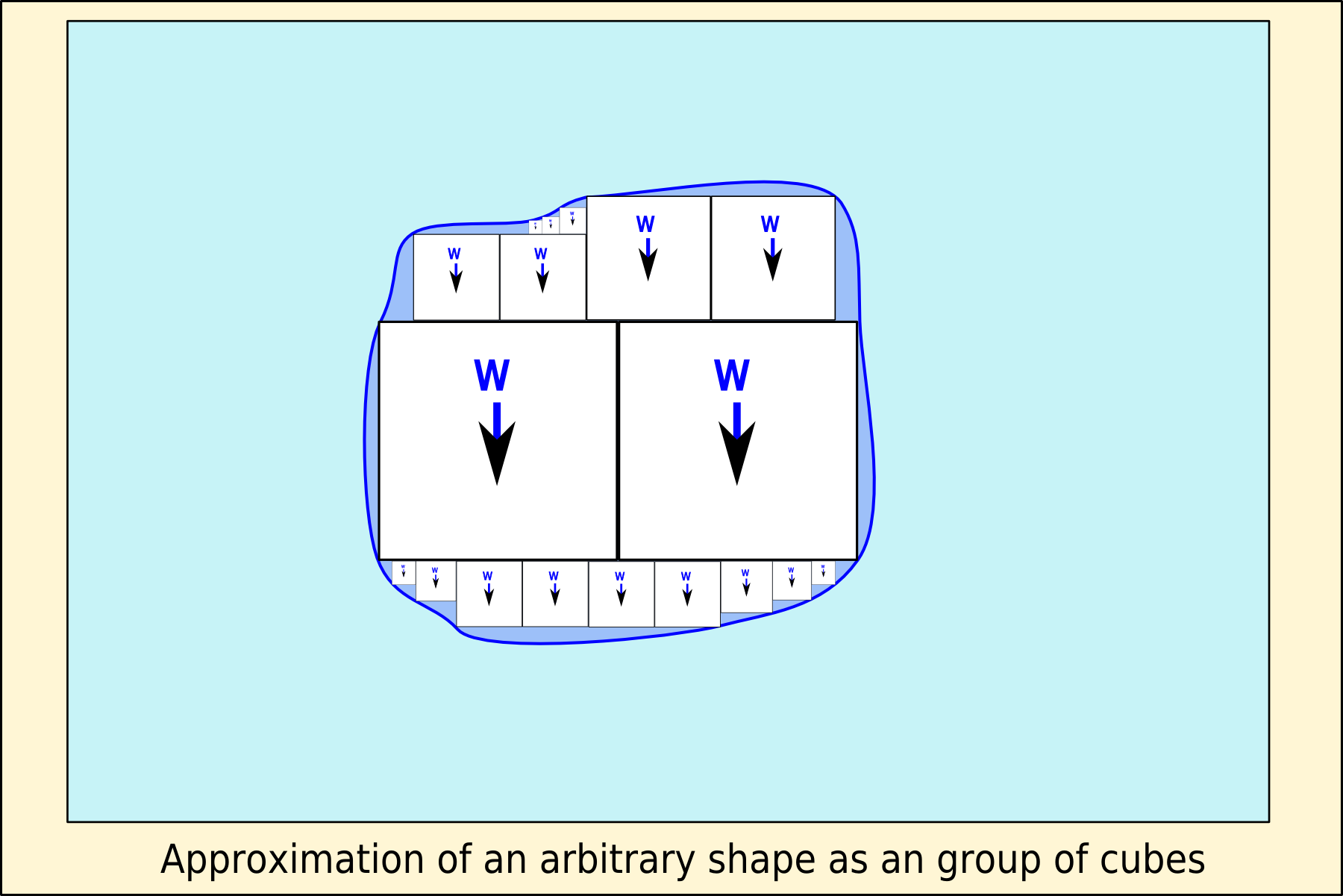
Approximation of an arbitrary volume as a group of cubes

A simplified explanation for the integration of the pressure over the contact area may be stated as follows:

Consider a cube immersed in a fluid with the upper surface horizontal.

The sides are identical in area, and have the same depth distribution, therefore they also have the same pressure distribution, and consequently the same total force resulting from hydrostatic pressure, exerted perpendicular to the plane of the surface of each side.

There are two pairs of opposing sides, therefore the resultant horizontal forces balance in both orthogonal directions, and the resultant force is zero.

The upward force on the cube is the pressure on the bottom surface integrated over its area. The surface is at constant depth, so the pressure is constant. Therefore, the integral of the pressure over the area of the horizontal bottom surface of the cube is the hydrostatic pressure at that depth multiplied by the area of the bottom surface.

Similarly, the downward force on the cube is the pressure on the top surface integrated over its area. The surface is at constant depth, so the pressure is constant. Therefore, the integral of the pressure over the area of the horizontal top surface of the cube is the hydrostatic pressure at that depth multiplied by the area of the top surface.

As this is a cube, the top and bottom surfaces are identical in shape and area, and the pressure difference between the top and bottom of the cube is directly proportional to the depth difference, and the resultant force difference is exactly equal to the weight of the fluid that would occupy the volume of the cube in its absence.

This means that the resultant upward force on the cube is equal to the weight of the fluid that would fit into the volume of the cube, and the downward force on the cube is its weight, in the absence of external forces.

This analogy is valid for variations in the size of the cube.

If two cubes are placed alongside each other with a face of each in contact, the pressures and resultant forces on the sides or parts thereof in contact are balanced and may be disregarded, as the contact surfaces are equal in shape, size and pressure distribution, therefore the buoyancy of two cubes in contact is the sum of the buoyancies of each cube. This analogy can be extended to an arbitrary number of cubes.

An object of any shape can be approximated as a group of cubes in contact with each other, and as the size of the cubes is decreased, the precision of the approximation increases. The limiting case for infinitely small cubes is the exact equivalence.

Angled surfaces do not nullify the analogy as the resultant force can be split into orthogonal components and each dealt with in the same way.

== Refinements ==
Archimedes' principle does not consider the surface tension (capillarity) acting on the body. Moreover, Archimedes' principle has been found to break down in complex fluids.

There is an exception to Archimedes' principle known as the bottom (or side) case. This occurs when a side of the object is touching the bottom (or side) of the vessel it is submerged in, and no liquid seeps in along that side. In this case, the net force has been found to be different from Archimedes' principle, as, since no fluid seeps in on that side, the symmetry of pressure is broken.

== Principle of flotation ==
Archimedes' principle shows the buoyant force and displacement of fluid. However, the concept of Archimedes' principle can be applied when considering why objects float. Proposition 5 of Archimedes' treatise On Floating Bodies states that

Any floating object displaces its own weight of fluid.

— Archimedes of Syracuse

In other words, for an object floating on a liquid surface (like a boat) or floating submerged in a fluid (like a submarine in water or dirigible in air) the weight of the displaced fluid equals the weight of the object. Thus, only in the special case of floating does the buoyant force acting on an object equal the objects weight. Consider a 1-ton block of solid iron. As iron is nearly eight times as dense as water, it displaces only 1/8 ton of water when submerged, which is not enough to keep it afloat. Suppose the same iron block is reshaped into a bowl. It still weighs 1 ton, but when it is put in water, it displaces a greater volume of water than when it was a block. The deeper the iron bowl is immersed, the more water it displaces, and the greater the buoyant force acting on it. When the buoyant force equals 1 ton, it will sink no farther.

When any boat displaces a weight of water equal to its own weight, it floats. This is often called the "principle of flotation": A floating object displaces a weight of fluid equal to its own weight. Every ship, submarine, and dirigible must be designed to displace a weight of fluid at least equal to its own weight. A 10,000-ton ship's hull must be built wide enough, long enough and deep enough to displace 10,000 tons of water and still have some hull above the water to prevent it from sinking. It needs extra hull to fight waves that would otherwise fill it and, by increasing its mass, cause it to submerge. The same is true for vessels in air: a dirigible that weighs 100 tons needs to displace 100 tons of air. If it displaces more, it rises; if it displaces less, it falls. If the dirigible displaces exactly its weight, it hovers at a constant altitude.

While they are related to it, the principle of flotation and the concept that a submerged object displaces a volume of fluid equal to its own volume are not Archimedes' principle. Archimedes' principle, as stated above, equates the buoyant force to the weight of the fluid displaced.

One common point of confusion regarding Archimedes' principle is the meaning of displaced volume. Common demonstrations involve measuring the rise in water level when an object floats on the surface in order to calculate the displaced water. This measurement approach fails with a buoyant submerged object because the rise in the water level is directly related to the volume of the object and not the mass (except if the effective density of the object equals exactly the fluid density).

== Eureka ==
Archimedes reportedly exclaimed "Eureka" after he realized how to detect whether a crown is made of impure gold. While he did not use Archimedes' principle in the widespread tale and used displaced water only for measuring the volume of the crown, there is an alternative approach using the principle: Balance the crown and pure gold on a scale in the air and then put the scale into water. According to Archimedes' principle, if the density of the crown differs from the density of pure gold, the scale will get out of balance under water.

== See also ==
- Phragmen's voting rules – a ballot load balancing method analogous to the idea of Archimedes' principle.
- Ship stability – Archimedes's theory of displacement of fluid is a core principle of ship stability.
- List of eponymous laws
