= Air displacement plethysmography =

Human body composition measurement method

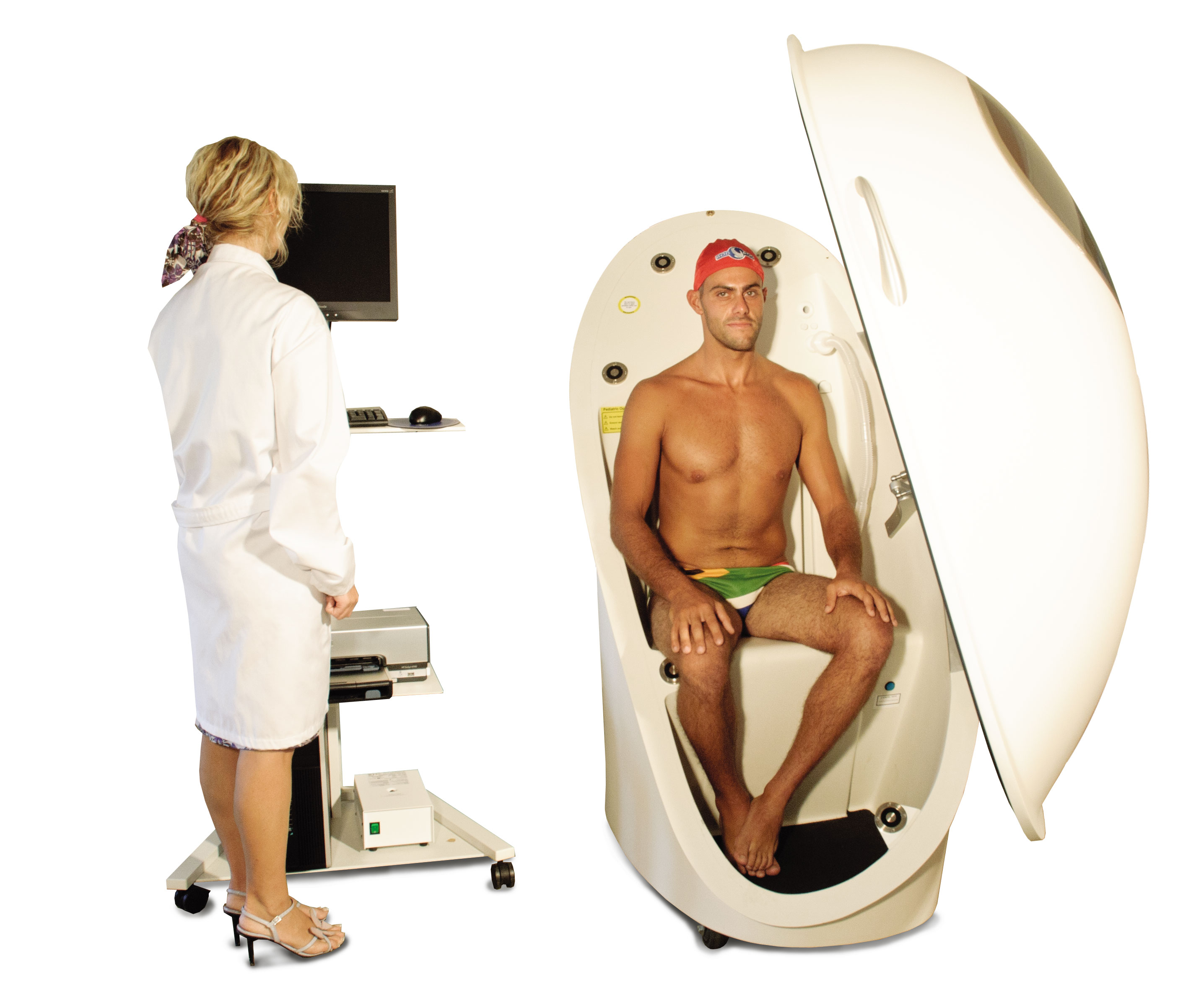
Body composition measurement in adults with whole-body air displacement plethysmography (ADP) technology

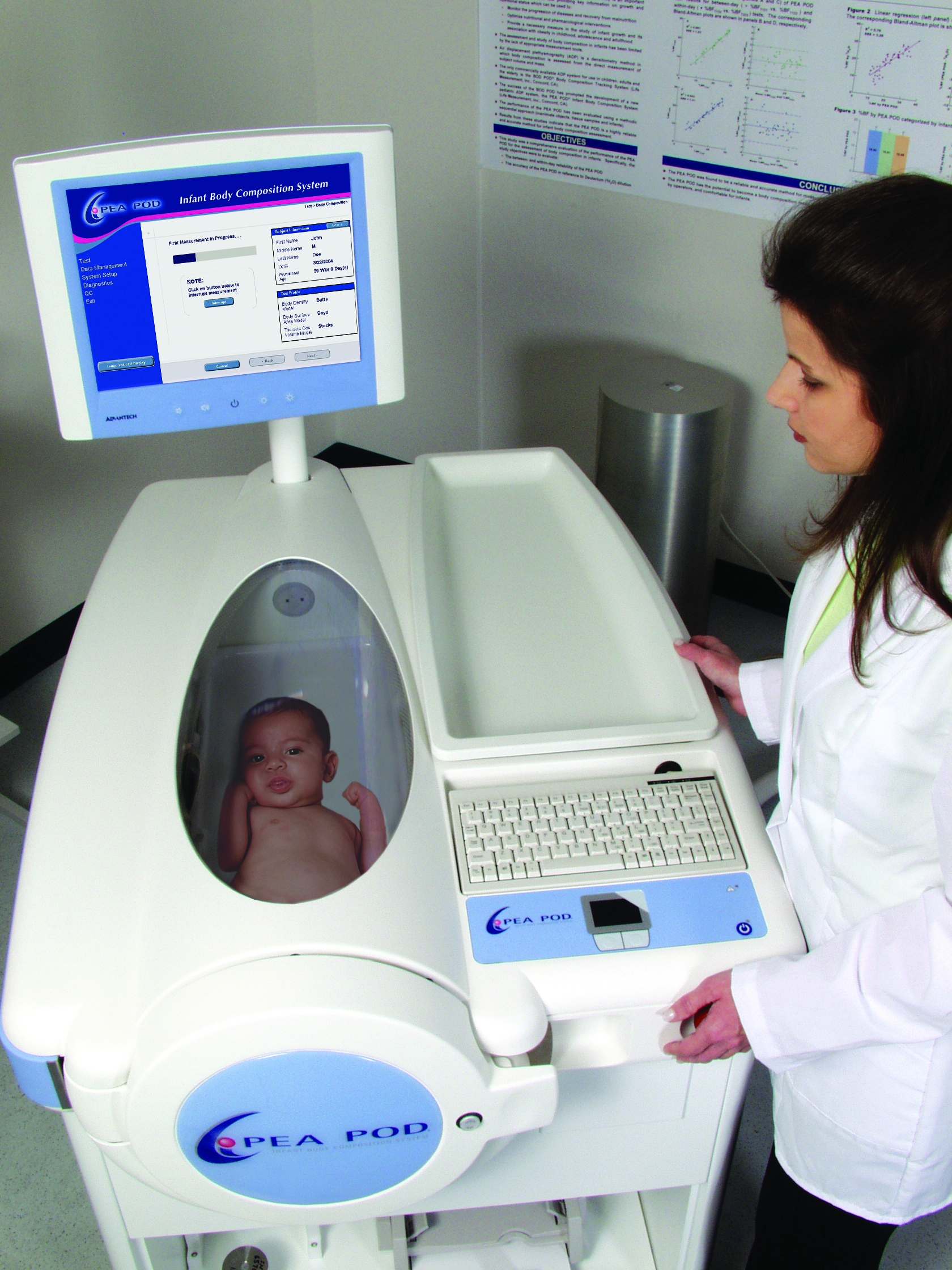
Body composition measurement in infants with whole-body air displacement plethysmography (ADP) technology

Air displacement plethysmography (ADP, also known as whole-body air displacement plethysmography) is a recognized and scientifically validated densitometric method to measure human body composition. ADP is based on the same principles as the gold standard method of hydrostatic weighing, but through a densitometric technique that uses air displacement rather than water immersion. Air-displacement plethysmography offers several advantages over established reference methods, including a quick, comfortable, automated, noninvasive, and safe measurement process, and accommodates various subject types (e.g., children, obese, elderly, and disabled persons).

== History ==
The principles of plethysmography were first applied to the measurement of the body volume and composition of infants in the early 1900s, but it was not until the 1960s that relatively stable measurements were achieved. However, these systems required that ambient conditions be maintained constant. Applications in humans have been limited, in part by technical difficulties in adjusting for irregularities in temperature and humidity of the air next to the skin and the air. Because of inconveniences such as these and various technology difficulties, none of the early air-displacement plethysmographs were ever developed for common, everyday use.

Later experimental air-displacement plethysmographs developed in the 1980s were more advanced technologically, but it was only in the mid-1990s, that the first commercially available air-displacement plethysmograph was introduced for adults and early 2000 for infants.

== How it works ==
With air-displacement plethysmography, the volume of an object is measured indirectly by determining the volume of air it displaces inside an enclosed chamber (plethysmograph). Thus, human body volume is measured when a subject sits inside the chamber and displaces a volume of air equal to his or her body volume. Body volume is calculated indirectly by subtracting the volume of air remaining inside the chamber when the subject is inside from the volume of air in the chamber when it is empty. The volume of air inside the chamber is calculated by slightly changing the size of the chamber (e.g. by moving a diaphragm in one of the walls) and applying relevant physical gas laws to determine the total volume from the changing air pressure within the chamber as its size is altered. Boyle's law states that at a constant temperature, volume (V) and pressure (P) are inversely related. Therefore, when a constant temperature is maintained (isothermal conditions), Boyle's law can be applied. Consequently, most early plethysmographs required temperature-controlled surroundings and isothermal conditions within the test chamber.

== Validations ==
Air displacement plethysmographs have been validated against main body composition assessment techniques:

- Hydrostatic weighing
- Main Reference Methods
  - Hydrostatic weighing
  - Dual-energy X-ray absorptiometry
  - Measurement of Total Body Water (TBW) by isotope dilution
  - Measurement of total body potassium
  - Multi-compartment models
- Deuterium method (in infants)
- Whole body magnetic resonance tomography.
