= Buoyancy =

Upward force that opposes the weight of an object immersed in fluid

The forces at work in buoyancy. The object floats at rest because the upward force of buoyancy is equal to the downward force of gravity.

Buoyancy (/ˈbɔɪənsi, ˈbuːjənsi/), or upthrust, is the force exerted by a fluid opposing the weight of a partially or fully immersed object (which may also be a parcel of fluid). The pressure of a fluid increases with depth below the fluid's surface because of the weight of the fluid above. Thus, the pressure at the bottom of a container of fluid is greater than at the top of the container. Similarly, the pressure at the bottom of an object submerged in a fluid is greater than at the top of the object. This pressure difference results in a net upward force on the object. The magnitude of the force is proportional to the pressure difference, and, as explained by Archimedes' principle, is equivalent to the weight of the fluid that would otherwise occupy the submerged volume of the object, i.e. the displaced fluid.

An object under the influence of gravity with an average density greater than the surrounding fluid tends to sink because its weight is greater than the weight of the fluid it displaces. If the object is less dense, buoyancy can keep the object afloat.

Buoyancy also applies to fluid mixtures, and is the most common driving force of convection currents. In these cases, the mathematical modelling is altered to apply to continua, but the principles remain the same. Examples of buoyancy driven flows include the spontaneous separation of air and water or oil and water.

Buoyancy is a function of the force of gravity or other source of acceleration on objects of different densities, and for that reason is considered an apparent force, in the same way that centrifugal force is an apparent force as a function of inertia. Buoyancy can exist in environments without gravity, but without some source of acceleration creating a non-inertial reference frame, buoyancy does not exist.

The center of buoyancy of an object is the center of gravity of the displaced volume of fluid.

== Archimedes' principle ==
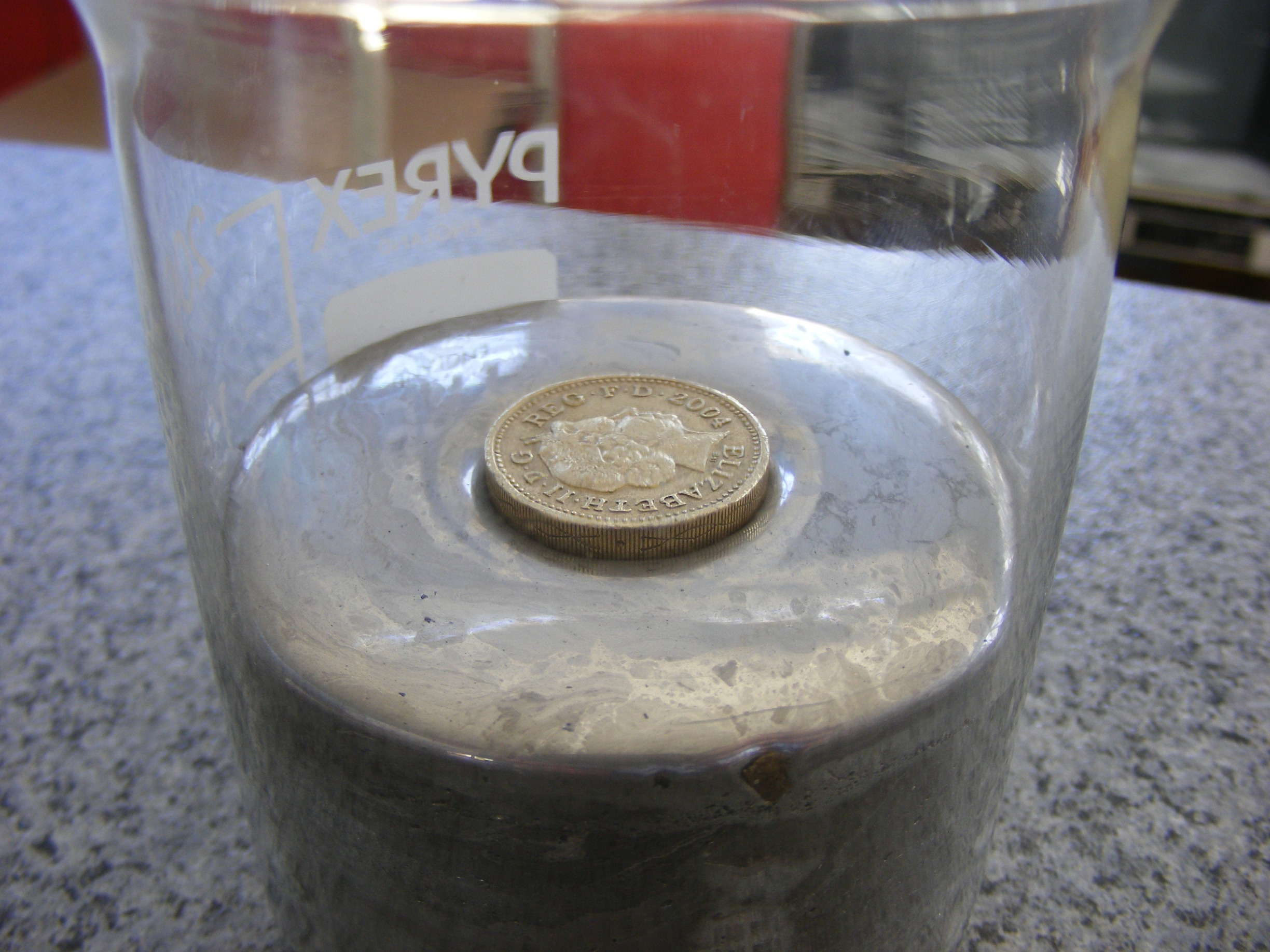
A metallic coin (an old British pound coin) floats in mercury due to the buoyancy force upon it and appears to float higher because of the surface tension of the mercury.

The Galileo's Ball experiment, showing the different buoyancy of the same object, depending on its surrounding medium. The ball has certain buoyancy in water, but once ethanol is added (which is less dense than water), it reduces the density of the medium, thus making the ball sink further down (reducing its buoyancy).

Archimedes' principle is named after Archimedes of Syracuse, who first discovered this law in 212 BC. For objects, floating and sunken, and in gases as well as liquids (i.e. a fluid), Archimedes' principle may be stated thus in terms of forces:

Any object, wholly or partially immersed in a fluid, is buoyed up by a force equal to the weight of the fluid displaced by the object

—with the clarifications that for a sunken object the volume of displaced fluid is the volume of the object, and for a floating object on a liquid, the weight of the displaced liquid is the weight of the object.

Mathematically we note.

$$\mathbf{F_B}=-\mathbf{F_g}=-\rho V\textbf{g}$$

Where $\mathbf{g}$ is the local gravitational acceleration, $\rho$ the density of the fluid, and $V$ the displaced volume; the negative sign arises since the buoyant force acts in the opposite direction as the object's weight. Archimedes' principle does not consider the surface tension (capillarity) acting on the body, but this additional force modifies only the amount of fluid displaced and the spatial distribution of the displacement, so the principle $\mathbf{F_B}=-\mathbf{F_g}$ remains valid.

It's important to note that the density of an object is defined to be its mass per unit volume.

$$\rho = \frac{M}{V}$$

If an object is fully submerged and we assume that the net force acting upon the object in the vertical direction is zero. If fully submerged the displaced volume is simply the volume of the object.

$$F_\text{net} = 0 = F_B - F_g = \rho_\text{fluid} Vg - \rho_\text{obj} V g\implies\rho_\text{fluid}=\rho_\text{obj}$$

This implies that objects of greater density than the fluid will sink, and objects of lesser density will float. Example: If a person drops wood into water, buoyancy will keep it afloat.

== Applications ==
A common application of Archimedes' principle is hydrostatic weighing. Suppose we can measure the tension of a hanging mass by a force probe. Assuming Archimedes' principle, when the mass is submerged in the fluid and the net force is zero,

$$F_\text{net} = 0 = F_B + F_T - F_g =\rho_\text{fluid} Vg+F_T-mg$$
$$\implies V=\frac{mg-F_T}{\rho_\text{fluid}g}$$

Recall that the definition of density states

$$\rho_\text{obj}=\frac{m}{V}=\frac{mg\rho_\text{fluid}}{mg-F_T}$$

Thus, the density of the immersed object relative to the density of the fluid can easily be calculated without measuring any volumes. Below we can denote the ratio of densities.

$$\frac{\rho_\text{obj}}{\rho_\text{fluid}} = \frac { F_g} {F_g - F_\text{app}}\,$$

== Forces and equilibrium ==
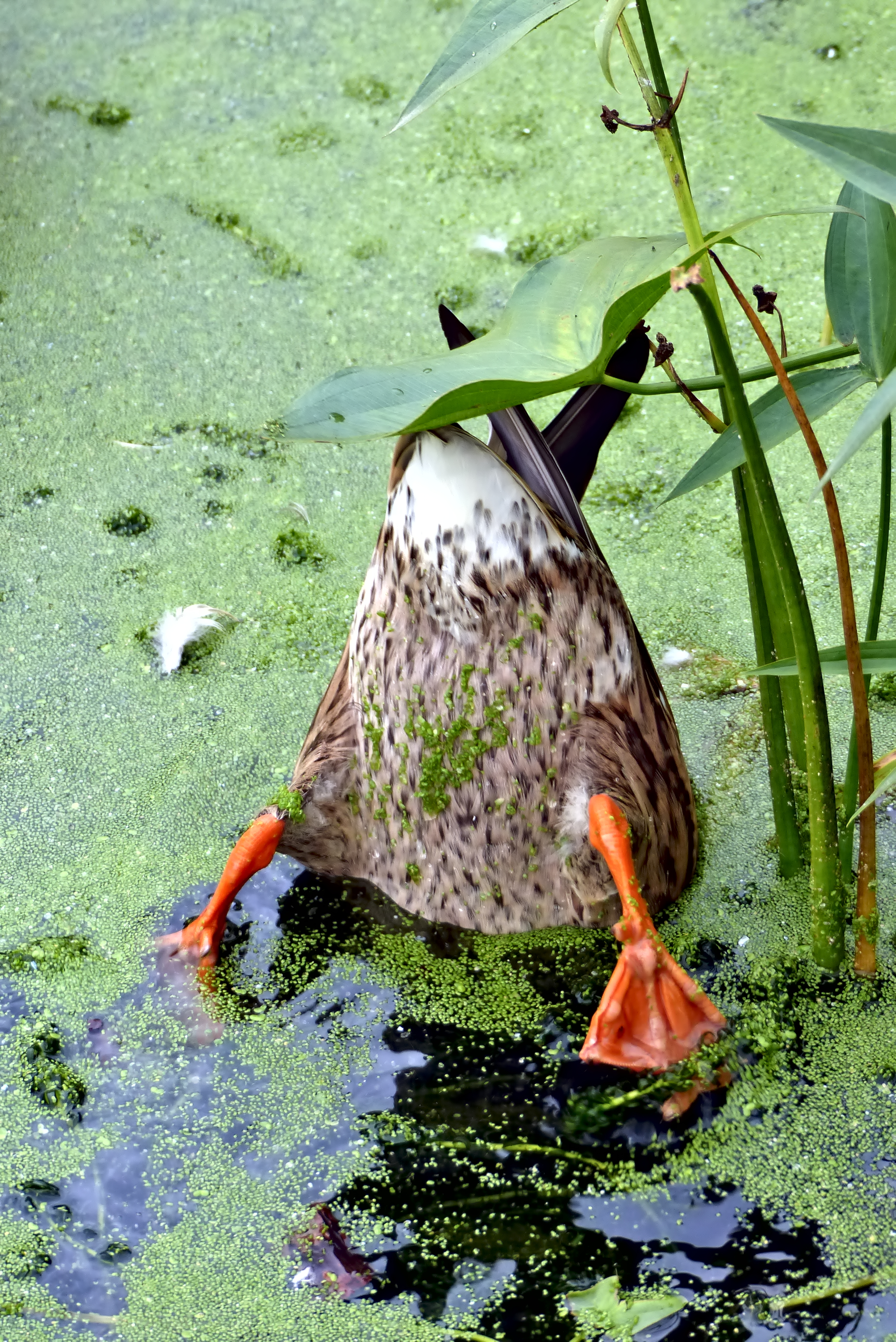
A duck has difficulties to get under water due to its buoyancy. When no swimming forces are implied, the natural equilibrium of forces keeps about half of the duck above water.

The equation to calculate the pressure inside a fluid in equilibrium is:

$$\mathbf{f}+\operatorname{div}\,\sigma=0$$

where f is the force density exerted by some outer field on the fluid, and σ is the Cauchy stress tensor. In this case the stress tensor is proportional to the identity tensor:

$$\sigma_{ij}=-p\delta_{ij}.\,$$

Here δ_{ij} is the Kronecker delta. Using this the above equation becomes:

$$\mathbf{f}=\nabla p.\,$$

Assuming the outer force field is conservative, that is it can be written as the negative gradient of some scalar valued function:

$$\mathbf{f}=-\nabla\Phi.\,$$

Then:

$$\nabla(p+\Phi)=0 \Longrightarrow p+\Phi = \text{constant}.\,$$

Therefore, the shape of the open surface of a fluid equals the equipotential plane of the applied outer conservative force field. Let the z-axis point downward. In this case the field is gravity, so Φ = −ρ_{f}gz where g is the gravitational acceleration, ρ_{f} is the mass density of the fluid. Taking the pressure as zero at the surface, where z is zero, the constant will be zero, so the pressure inside the fluid, when it is subject to gravity, is

$$p=\rho_f g z.\,$$

So pressure increases with depth below the surface of a liquid, as z denotes the distance from the surface of the liquid into it. Any object with a non-zero vertical depth will have different pressures on its top and bottom, with the pressure on the bottom being greater. This difference in pressure causes the upward buoyancy force.

The buoyancy force exerted on a body can now be calculated easily, since the internal pressure of the fluid is known. The force exerted on the body can be calculated by integrating the stress tensor over the surface of the body which is in contact with the fluid:

$$\mathbf{B}=\oint \sigma \, d\mathbf{A}.$$

The surface integral can be transformed into a volume integral with the help of the Gauss theorem:

$$\mathbf{B}=\int \operatorname{div}\sigma \, dV = -\int \mathbf{f}\, dV = -\rho_f \mathbf{g} \int\,dV=-\rho_f \mathbf{g} V$$

where V is the measure of the volume in contact with the fluid, that is the volume of the submerged part of the body, since the fluid does not exert force on the part of the body which is outside of it.

The magnitude of buoyancy force may be appreciated a bit more from the following argument. Consider any object of arbitrary shape and volume V surrounded by a liquid. The force the liquid exerts on an object within the liquid is equal to the weight of the liquid with a volume equal to that of the object. This force is applied in a direction opposite to gravitational force, that is of magnitude:

$$B = \rho_f V_\text{disp}\, g, \,$$

where ρ_{f} is the density of the fluid, V_{disp} is the volume of the displaced body of liquid, and g is the gravitational acceleration at the location in question.

If this volume of liquid is replaced by a solid body of exactly the same shape, the force the liquid exerts on it must be exactly the same as above. In other words, the "buoyancy force" on a submerged body is directed in the opposite direction to gravity and is equal in magnitude to

$$B = \rho_f V g. \,$$

Though the above derivation of Archimedes principle is correct, a paper by the Brazilian physicist Fabio M. S. Lima in 2012 proposed a more general approach for the evaluation of the buoyant force exerted by any fluid (even non-homogeneous) on a body with arbitrary shape based on the surface integral of the pressure force applied by the fluid over the entire body's surface. This method leads to the prediction that the buoyant force exerted on a rectangular block touching the bottom of a container points downward, which has been confirmed experimentally.

The net force on the object must be zero if it is to be a situation of fluid statics such that Archimedes principle is applicable, and is thus the sum of the buoyancy force and the object's weight

$$F_\text{net} = 0 = m g - \rho_f V_\text{disp} g \,$$

If the buoyancy of an (unrestrained and unpowered) object exceeds its weight, it tends to rise. An object whose weight exceeds its buoyancy tends to sink. Calculation of the upwards force on a submerged object during its accelerating period cannot be done by the Archimedes principle alone; it is necessary to consider dynamics of an object involving buoyancy. Once it fully sinks to the floor of the fluid or rises to the surface and settles, Archimedes principle can be applied alone. For a floating object, only the submerged volume displaces water. For a sunken object, the entire volume displaces water, and there will be an additional force of reaction from the solid floor.

In order for Archimedes' principle to be used alone, the object in question must be in equilibrium (the sum of the forces on the object must be zero), therefore;

$$mg = \rho_f V_\text{disp} g, \,$$

and therefore

$$m = \rho_f V_\text{disp}.  \,$$

showing that the depth to which a floating object will sink, and the volume of fluid it will displace, is independent of the gravitational field regardless of geographic location.

(Note: If the fluid in question is seawater, it will not have the same density (ρ) at every location, since the density depends on temperature and salinity. For this reason, a ship may display a Plimsoll line.)

It can be the case that forces other than just buoyancy and gravity come into play. This is the case if the object is restrained or if the object sinks to the solid floor. An object which tends to float requires a tension restraint force T in order to remain fully submerged. An object which tends to sink will eventually have a normal force of constraint N exerted upon it by the solid floor. The constraint force can be tension in a spring scale measuring its weight in the fluid, and is how apparent weight is defined.

If the object would otherwise float, the tension to restrain it fully submerged is:

$$T = \rho_f V g - m g . \,$$

When a sinking object settles on the solid floor, it experiences a normal force of:

$$N = m g - \rho_f V g . \,$$

Another possible formula for calculating buoyancy of an object is by finding the apparent weight of that particular object in the air (calculated in Newtons), and apparent weight of that object in the water (in Newtons). To find the force of buoyancy acting on the object when in air, using this particular information, this formula applies:

Buoyancy force = weight of object in empty space − weight of object immersed in fluid

The final result would be measured in Newtons.

Air's density is very small compared to most solids and liquids. For this reason, the weight of an object in air is approximately the same as its true weight in a vacuum. The buoyancy of air is neglected for most objects during a measurement in air because the error is usually insignificant (typically less than 0.1% except for objects of very low average density such as a balloon or light foam).

=== Simplified model ===
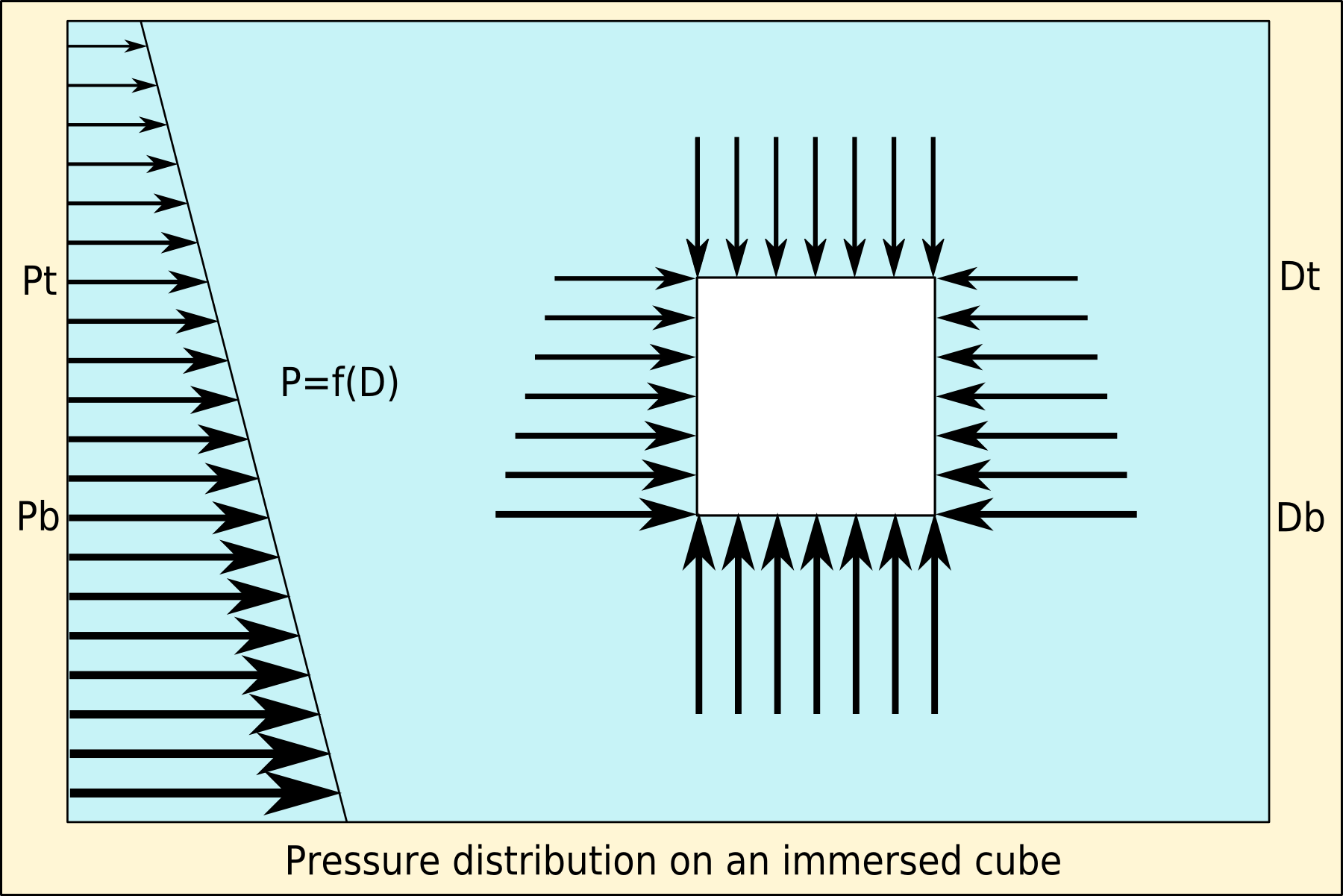
Pressure distribution on an immersed cube

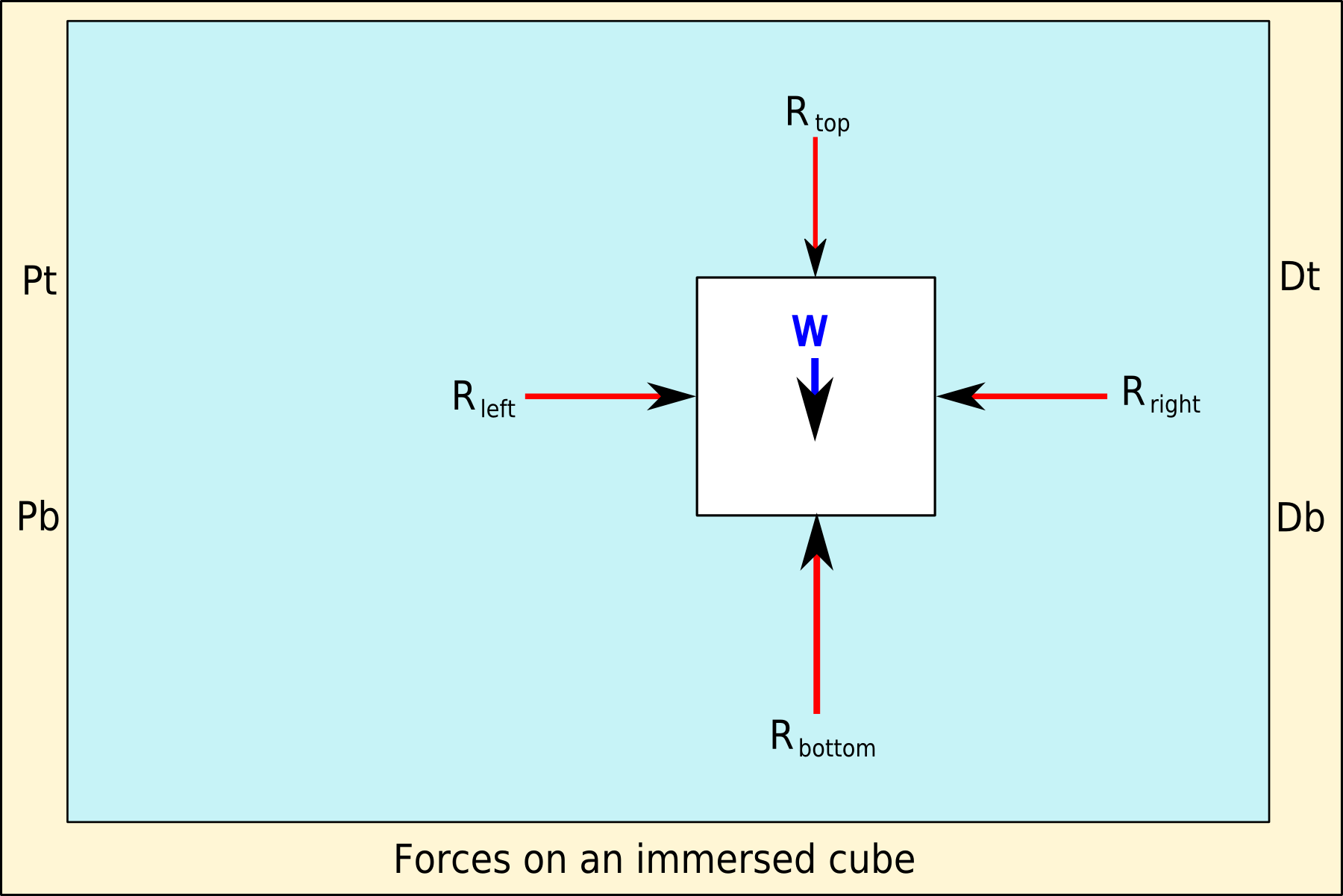
Forces on an immersed cube

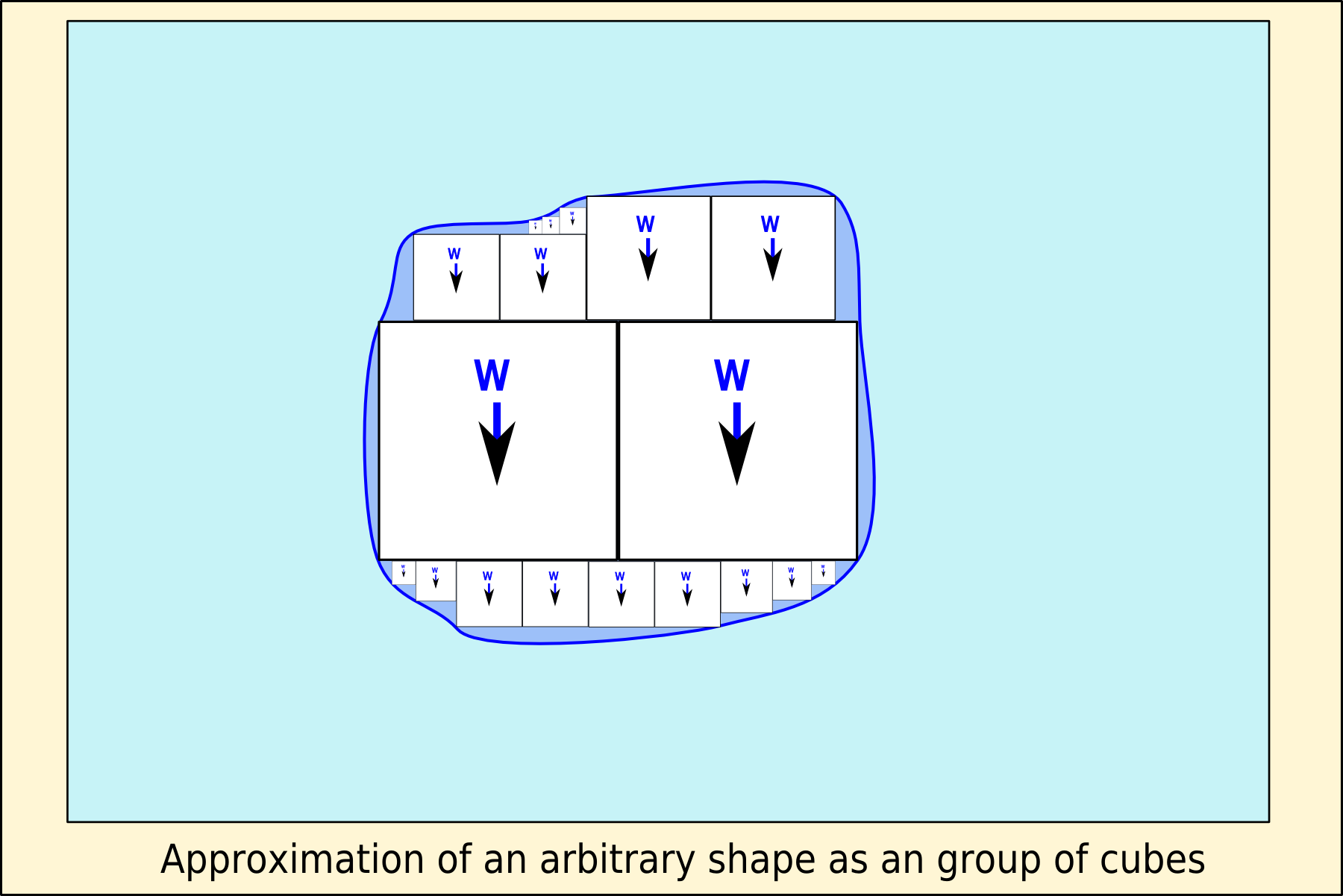
Approximation of an arbitrary volume as a group of cubes

A simplified explanation for the integration of the pressure over the contact area may be stated as follows:

Consider a cube immersed in a fluid with the upper surface horizontal.

The sides are identical in area, and have the same depth distribution, therefore they also have the same pressure distribution, and consequently the same total force resulting from hydrostatic pressure, exerted perpendicular to the plane of the surface of each side.

There are two pairs of opposing sides, therefore the resultant horizontal forces balance in both orthogonal directions, and the resultant force is zero.

The upward force on the cube is the pressure on the bottom surface integrated over its area. The surface is at constant depth, so the pressure is constant. Therefore, the integral of the pressure over the area of the horizontal bottom surface of the cube is the hydrostatic pressure at that depth multiplied by the area of the bottom surface.

Similarly, the downward force on the cube is the pressure on the top surface integrated over its area. The surface is at constant depth, so the pressure is constant. Therefore, the integral of the pressure over the area of the horizontal top surface of the cube is the hydrostatic pressure at that depth multiplied by the area of the top surface.

As this is a cube, the top and bottom surfaces are identical in shape and area, and the pressure difference between the top and bottom of the cube is directly proportional to the depth difference, and the resultant force difference is exactly equal to the weight of the fluid that would occupy the volume of the cube in its absence.

This means that the resultant upward force on the cube is equal to the weight of the fluid that would fit into the volume of the cube, and the downward force on the cube is its weight, in the absence of external forces.

This analogy is valid for variations in the size of the cube.

If two cubes are placed alongside each other with a face of each in contact, the pressures and resultant forces on the sides or parts thereof in contact are balanced and may be disregarded, as the contact surfaces are equal in shape, size and pressure distribution, therefore the buoyancy of two cubes in contact is the sum of the buoyancies of each cube. This analogy can be extended to an arbitrary number of cubes.

An object of any shape can be approximated as a group of cubes in contact with each other, and as the size of the cube is decreased, the precision of the approximation increases. The limiting case for infinitely small cubes is the exact equivalence.

Angled surfaces do not nullify the analogy as the resultant force can be split into orthogonal components and each dealt with in the same way.

=== Static stability ===
Illustration of the stability of bottom-heavy (left) and top-heavy (right) ships with respect to the positions of their centres of buoyancy (CB) and gravity (CG)

A floating object is stable if it tends to restore itself to an equilibrium position after a small displacement. For example, floating objects will generally have vertical stability, as if the object is pushed down slightly, this will create a greater buoyancy force, which, unbalanced by the weight force, will push the object back up.

Rotational stability is of great importance to floating vessels. Given a small angular displacement, the vessel may return to its original position (stable), move away from its original position (unstable), or remain where it is (neutral).

Rotational stability depends on the relative lines of action of forces on an object. The upward buoyancy force on an object acts through the center of buoyancy, being the centroid of the displaced volume of fluid. The weight force on the object acts through its center of gravity. A buoyant object will be stable if the center of gravity is beneath the center of buoyancy because any angular displacement will then produce a 'righting moment'.

The stability of a buoyant object at the surface is complex, and it may remain stable even if the center of gravity is above the center of buoyancy, provided that when disturbed from the equilibrium position, the center of buoyancy moves further to the same side that the center of gravity moves, thus providing a positive righting moment. If this occurs, the floating object is said to have a positive metacentric height. This situation is typically valid for a range of heel angles, beyond which the center of buoyancy does not move enough to provide a positive righting moment, and the object becomes unstable. It is possible to shift from positive to negative or vice versa more than once during a heeling disturbance, and many shapes are stable in more than one position.

== States of buoyancy ==
Buoyancy is a characteristic of any object with a volume immersed in any fluid with a density in a gravitational field or undergoing acceleration. There are three possible states of buoyancy.

positive buoyancy
If the buoyancy forces exceed the weight, the object is positively buoyant, and will tend to float upwards in the fluid.
neutral buoyancy

If the buoyancy forces exactly balance the weight, the object is neutrally buoyant, and will tend to remain in the same place in the fluid unless other disturbing forces exist.
negative buoyancy
If the buoyancy forces are less than the weight, the object is negatively buoyant and will tend to sink downwards in the fluid.

== Compressible objects ==
As an immersed object rises or falls through a fluid, the external pressure on it changes, and, as all objects are compressible to some extent, so does the object's volume. Buoyancy depends on volume and so an object's buoyancy reduces if it is compressed and increases if it expands. The buoyancy also changes if the density of the external fluid changes.

If an object at equilibrium has a compressibility less than that of the surrounding fluid, the object's equilibrium is stable and it a displacement from the neutral depth in a correction and it will return to the neutral. If, however, its compressibility is greater, its equilibrium is unstable, and it rises and expands on the slightest upward perturbation, or falls and compresses on the slightest downward perturbation.

=== Submarines ===
Submarines submerge by filling large ballast tanks with seawater. To dive, the tanks are opened to allow air to exhaust out the top of the tanks, while the water flows in from the bottom. Once the weight has been balanced so the overall density of the submarine is equal to the water around it, it has neutral buoyancy and will remain at that depth. Internal sealed and relatively incompressible trim tanks are used to adjust the mass and thereby the density of the vessel to achieve neutral buoyancy. Most military submarines operate with a slightly negative buoyancy and maintain depth by using the "lift" of the stabilizers with forward motion.

=== Balloons ===
The height to which a balloon rises tends to be stable. As a balloon rises it tends to increase in volume with reducing atmospheric pressure, but the balloon itself does not expand as much as the air on which it rides. The average density of the balloon decreases less than that of the surrounding air. The weight of the displaced air is reduced. A rising balloon stops rising when it and the displaced air are equal in weight. Similarly, a sinking balloon tends to stop sinking.

=== Divers ===
Underwater divers are a common example of the problem of unstable buoyancy due to compressibility. The diver typically wears an exposure suit which relies on gas-filled spaces for insulation, and may also wear a buoyancy compensator, which is a variable volume buoyancy bag which is inflated to increase buoyancy and deflated to decrease buoyancy. The desired condition is usually neutral buoyancy when the diver is swimming in mid-water, and this condition is unstable, so the diver is constantly making fine adjustments by control of lung volume, and has to adjust the contents of the buoyancy compensator if the depth varies. As the breathing gas is used up the diver will get lighter and more buoyant, and therefore need less gas for buoyancy at a given depth.

== Density ==
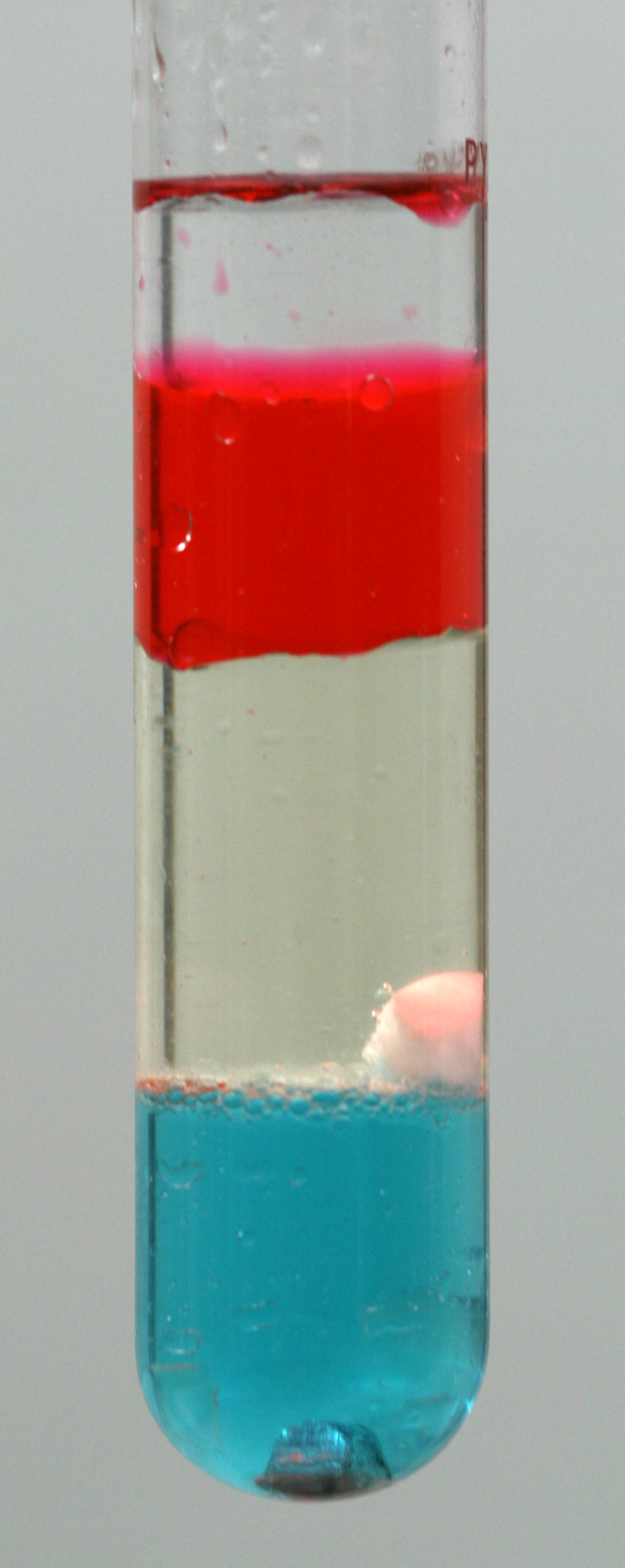
Density column of liquids and solids: baby oil rubbing alcohol (with red food colouring) vegetable oil wax water (with blue food colouring) and aluminium.

If the weight of an object is less than the weight of the displaced fluid when fully submerged, then the object has an average density that is less than the fluid and when fully submerged will experience a buoyancy force greater than its own weight This is called positive buoyancy. If the fluid has a surface, such as water in a lake or the sea, the object will float and settle at a level where it displaces the same weight of fluid as the weight of the object. If the object is immersed in the fluid, such as a submerged submarine or air in a balloon, it will tend to rise. If the object has exactly the same average density as the fluid, then its buoyancy equals its weight. It will remain submerged in the fluid, but it will neither sink nor float, although a disturbance in either direction will cause it to drift away from its position. This is called neutral buoyancy. An object with a higher average density than the fluid will never experience more buoyancy than weight and it will sink. This is called negative buoyancy. A ship will float even though it may be made of steel (which is much denser than water), because it encloses a volume of air (which is much less dense than water), and the resulting shape has an average density less than that of the water.

== See also ==
- Atmosphere of Earth, also known as Air – Gas layer surrounding Earth
- Archimedes paradox – Apparent paradox of hydrostatic pressure
- Buoy – Floating structure or device
- Brunt–Väisälä frequency – Measure of fluid stability against vertical displacement
- Buoyancy compensator (diving) – Equipment for controlling the buoyancy of a diver
- Buoyancy compensator (aviation) – Equipment to regulate buoyancy of airships
- Cartesian diver – Classic science experiment demonstrating the Archimedes' principle and the ideal gas law
- Dasymeter – Device used to measure to density of gases
- Diving weighting system – Ballast carried to counteract buoyancy
- Hydrostatics – Branch of fluid mechanics that studies fluids at rest
- Galileo thermometer – Thermometer containing several glass vessels of varying density
- Hull (watercraft) – Watertight buoyant body of a ship or boat
- Hydrometer – Device used to measure density of liquids
- Hydrostatic weighing – Technique for measuring the density of a living person's body
- Lighter than air – Property necessary for a gas to be considered a lifting gas
- Naval architecture – Engineering discipline of marine vessels
- Plimsoll line – Legal limit to which a merchant ship may be loaded
- Pontoon – Float used to support a boat
- Quicksand – Colloid consisting of granular material and water
- Salt fingering – Mixing process of warm, salty water with colder, fresher water
- Submarine – Watercraft capable of independent underwater operation
- Swim bladder – Gas-filled organ in bony fish
- Thrust – Reaction force
