= Hydrostatic weighing =

Technique for measuring the density of a living person's body

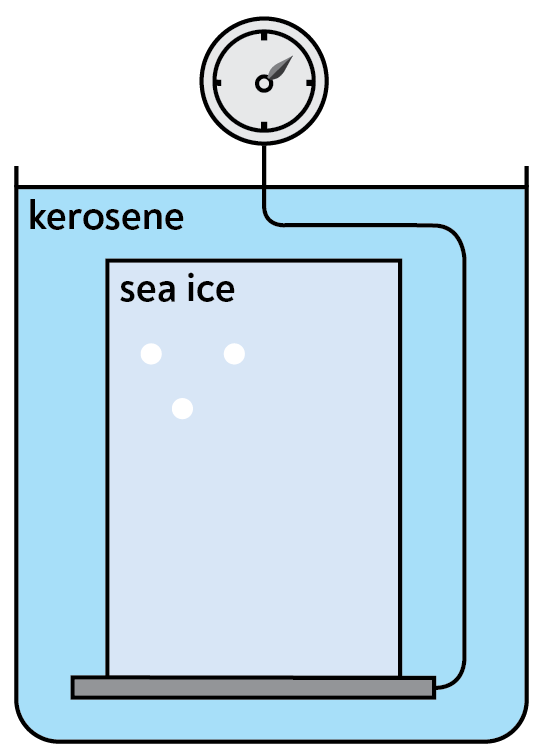
Measurements of sea ice density using hydrostatic weighing in kerosene

Hydrostatic weighing, also referred to as underwater weighing or hydrodensitometry,is a technique for measuring the relative density of an object. It is a direct application of Archimedes' principle, that the upward buoyant force that is exerted on a body immersed in a fluid, is equal to the weight of the fluid that the body displaces.

== Method ==
Hydrostatic weighing makes use of the apparent reduced weight of an object when weighed in a less dense liquid due to the buoyant force exerted upon it.

Relative density (with respect to the liquid) can be calculated using the following formula:

where

- W_{air} is the weight of the sample in air (measured in newtons, pounds-force or some other unit of force)
- W_{liquid} is the weight of the sample submerged in liquid (measured in the same units).

$$RD = \frac{W_\mathrm{air}}{W_\mathrm{air} - W_\mathrm{liquid}},$$

This technique cannot easily be used to measure relative densities less than one, because the sample will then float. W_{l}_{iquid} becomes a negative quantity, representing the force needed to keep the sample underwater.

=== Use of reaction force ===
This technique can struggle with accuracy when measuring objects much more dense than the liquid used. This is because a change in volume will produce a small change in measured weight compared to the weight of the object. While dense liquids do exist, such as mercury or Clerici solution, their use can be complicated by their toxicity.

An alternative solution is to measure the equal and opposite reaction force (that acts in the opposite direction to the buoyant force). Here a container of liquid is weighed, then weighed again with the object suspend in it. The container will aper to gain weight equal to the buoyant force. For compact objects in a close fitting container this can lead to large change in weight compared to the initial weigh of the liquid.

=== Examples ===
Example 1: If a block of solid stone weighs 3 kilograms on dry land and 2 kilogram when immersed in a tub of water, then it has displaced 1 kilogram of water. Since 1 liter of water weighs 1 kilogram (at 4 °C), it follows that the volume of the block is 1 liter and the density (mass/volume) of the stone is 3 kilograms/liter.

Example 2: Consider a larger block of the same stone material as in Example 1 but with a 1-liter cavity inside of the same amount of stone. The block would still weigh 3 kilograms on dry land (ignoring the weight of air in the cavity) but it would now displace 2 liters of water so its immersed weight would be only 1 kilogram (at 4 °C).

== Applications ==
=== Human body measurements (hydrostatic body composition analysis) ===
Hydrostatic weighing is a procedure, pioneered by Behnke, Feen and Welham as means to later quantify the relation between specific gravity and fat content.

The residual volume in the lungs can add error if not measured directly or estimated accurately. Residual volume can be measured by gas dilution procedures or estimated from a person's age and height:

- RV-Est(liters, Men) = 1.310 × Ht. (meters) + 0.022 × Age (yrs., take as 25 for 18-25) − 1.232
- RV-Est(liters, Women) = 1.812 × Ht. (meters) + 0.016 × Age (yrs., take as 25 for 18-25) − 2.003

These estimates are for adults aged 18-70, have standard deviation of about 0.4 litres and have dependence on ethnicity, environmental factors, etc. Residual volume may also be estimated as a proportion of vital capacity (0.24 for men and 0.28 for women).

Body density can be calculated by the following equation:

$$D_b = \frac{M_a}{\frac{M_a - M_w}{D_w} - RV}$$

Where:

- D_{b} = Density of the body;
- M_{a} = "Mass in air" (i.e. dry weight);
- M_{w} = "Mass in water" (i.e. underwater weight);
- D_{w} = Density of water (based on water temperature);
- RV = Residual volume (the unfilled space enclosed by the body- e.g. volume of air in the lungs + respiratory passages after a maximum exhalation).

Once body density has been calculated from the data obtained by hydrostatic/underwater weighing, body composition can be estimated. The most commonly used equations for estimating the percent of body fat from density are those of Siri and Brozek et al.:

Siri (1956): Fat % = [4.950 /Density - 4.500]×100

Brozek et al. (1963): Fat % = [4.570 /Density - 4.142]×100

=== Sea ice ===
Hydrostatic weighing is also used to estimate the density of sea ice, as it is considered the most precise method. Typically, a sample of sea ice is weighed in air and in kerosene, as kerosene has a lower density than sea ice, can be cooled to sub-zero temperatures, and does not melt the ice. Sea ice density experiences substantial seasonality, with larger values during winter and lower values during summer. Due to the small difference between the density of seawater and sea ice, such seasonal changes in sea ice density affect its freeboard and introduce large uncertaintes of sea ice thickness estimates using satellite altimeters.

=== Radiation shielding ===
Hydrostatic weighing can be used to check for voids in radiation shielding .

== See also ==
- Body composition
- Composition of the human body
- Body fat percentage
