= Body composition =

Percentages of fat, bone, water and muscle in human bodies

In physical fitness, body composition refers to quantifying the different components (or "compartments") of a human body. The selection of compartments varies by model but may include fat, bone, water, and muscle. Two people of the same gender, height, and body weight may have completely different body types as a consequence of having different body compositions. This may be explained by a person having low or high body fat, dense muscles, or big bones.

== Compartment models ==
Body composition models typically use between 2 and 6 compartments to describe the body. Common models include:

- 2 compartment: Fat mass (FM) and fat-free mass (FFM)
- 3 compartment: Fat mass (FM), water, and fat-free dry mass
- 4 compartment: Fat mass (FM), water, protein, and mineral
- 5 compartment: Fat mass (FM), water, protein, bone mineral content, and non-osseous mineral content
- 6 compartment: Fat mass (FM), water, protein, bone mineral content, non-osseous mineral content, and glycogen

As a rule, the compartments must sum to the body weight. The proportion of each compartment as a percent is often reported, found by dividing the compartment weight by the body weight. Individual compartments may be estimated based on population averages or measured directly or indirectly. Many measurement methods exist with varying levels of accuracy. Typically, the higher compartment models are more accurate, as they require more data and thus account for more variation across individuals. The four compartment model is considered the reference model for assessment of body composition as it is robust to most variation and each of its components can be measured directly.

== Measurement methods ==
A wide variety of body composition measurement methods exist. The gold standard measurement technique for the 4-compartment model consists of a weight measurement, body density measurement using hydrostatic weighing or air displacement plethysmography, total body water calculation using isotope dilution analysis, and mineral content measurement by dual-energy X-ray absorptiometry (DEXA). However, it is also common to use a DEXA scan alone and refer to this as the "gold standard". These claims are somewhat dubious since measurements methods vary significantly from study to study. In practice, the measurement methods used will be a tradeoff between cost, availability, and accuracy.

=== DEXA ===
Body composition measurement with dual energy X-ray absorptiometry (DEXA) is used increasingly for a variety of clinical and research applications. A DEXA scan requires medical supervision by a radiologist. Total body scans using DEXA give accurate and precise measurements of body composition, including bone mineral content (BMC), bone mineral density (BMD), lean tissue mass, fat tissue mass, and fractional contribution of fat.

DEXA measurements are highly reproducible if the same type of machine is used, making them excellent for monitoring pharmaceutical therapy, nutritional or exercise intervention, sports training, and other body composition altering programs. They are also fast, simple, non-invasive, and expose the subject to a level of x-rays less than that of a cross-country flight. DEXA exams provide both total body and up to 14 regional (trunk, individual arms & legs, android, gynoid, etc.) results. However, the role of DEXA in clinical evaluations and research studies has been questioned by Wang et al. who stated that "the errors of the DXA [DEXA] method are still of concern if it were to be used as the criterion."

=== Hydrostatic weighing ===
Hydrostatic weighing, also referred to as underwater weighing, hydrostatic body composition analysis and hydrodensitometry, is a technique for measuring the density of a living person's body. It is a direct application of Archimedes' principle, that an object displaces its own volume of water.

=== Air displacement plethysmography ===
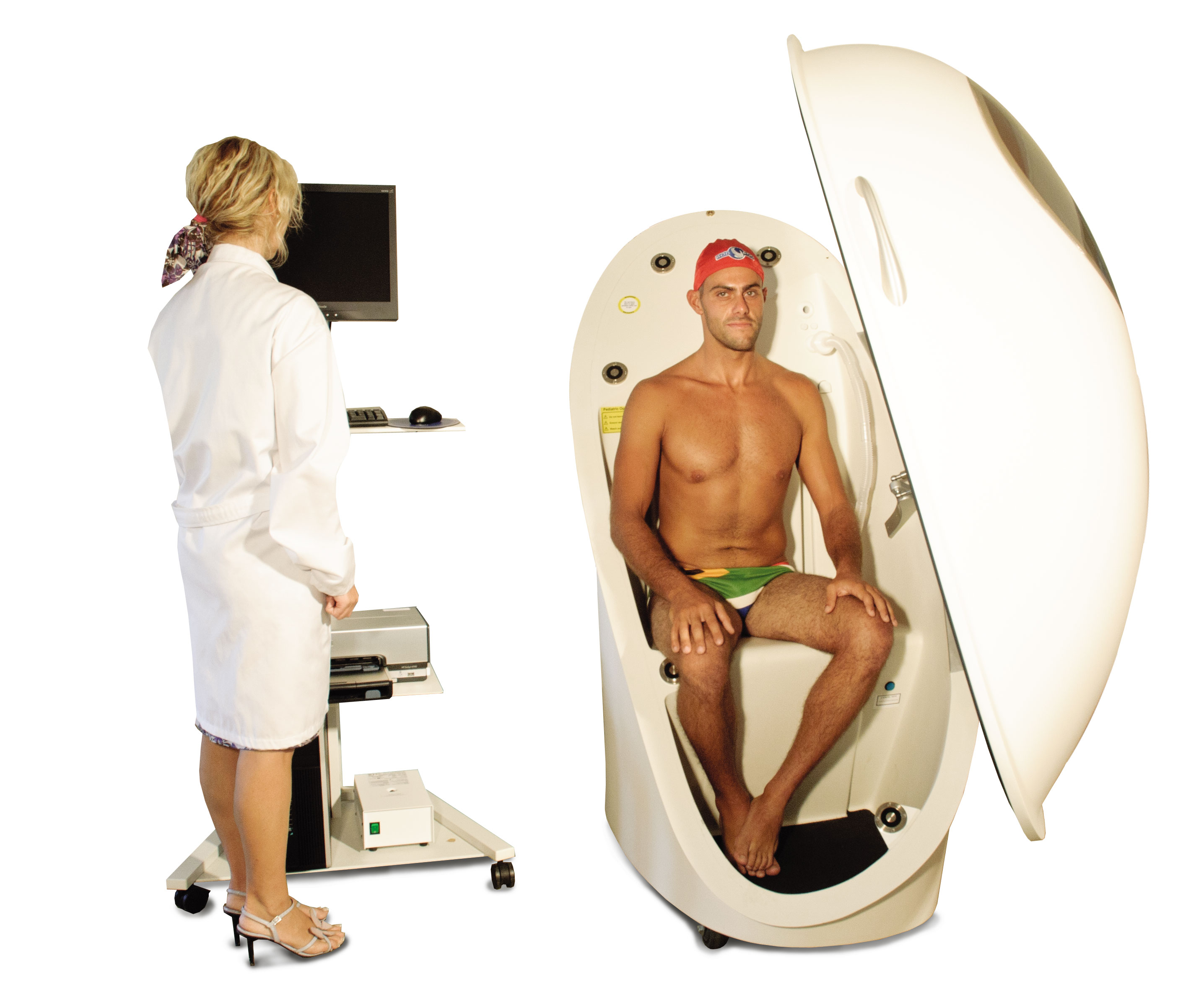
Body composition measurement with air displacement plethysmography or whole-body air displacement plethysmography (ADP) technology

Air displacement plethysmography is an alternative to underwater weighing for measuring body volume. The technique uses air as opposed to water and is known as air displacement plethysmography (ADP). Subjects enter a sealed chamber that measures their body volume through the displacement of air in the chamber. Next, body volume is combined with body weight (mass) to determine body density. The technique then estimates the percentage of body fat and lean body mass (LBM) through empirically derived equations similar to those used with underwater weighing (for the density of fat and fat-free mass).

=== Isotope dilution analysis ===
Total body water may be effectively measured using isotope dilution analysis of deuterium oxide.

=== Total body potassium ===
Potassium 40 is a naturally occurring radioactive isotope found in intracellular water, but is not present in stored triglycerides (fat). Whole body counting can measure the amount of potassium 40 (40K) in the body, a quantity called total body potassium (TBK). This can be used to estimate fat-free mass directly. It has mostly been replaced by newer, more accurate techniques such as DEXA.

=== Bioelectrical impedance analysis ===
Another method to estimate body water is bioelectrical impedance analysis (BIA), which uses the resistance of electrical flow through the body. BIA is highly sensitive to hydration status and water intake. Drinking water dilutes the electrolytes in the body, making it less conductive, as does increasing body fat. By controlling hydration status or performing multiple impedance measurements, it is possible to estimate body fat and other variables.

InBody developed the world's first 8-point tactile electrode system in 1996, a direct segmental analysis method that measures the impedance of five torsos using multiple frequencies. Many BIA products provide partial muscle and fat mass measurements, but not impedance, especially in the torso.

Recent advancements such as 8-point electrodes, multi-frequency measurements, and Direct Segmental Analysis, have improved the accuracy of BIA machines. BIA machines have found acceptance in medical, fitness, and wellness space owing to their ease-of-use, portability, quick measurements, and cost efficiency.

AURA Devices developed and launched a number of wearable bioimpedance trackers, including the first smart strap for Apple Watch that tracks body fat, muscles, lean mass, water levels, etc.

=== Body Volume Index ===
The Body Volume Index (BVI) is a technique used for measuring body shape. Initially, BVI technology employed white light scanning machines to measure an individual's body shape. However, recent technological advances in 3D measurement have enabled BVI to be calculated using images taken on a smartphone. Two images are required to create an individual 3D silhouette. By comparing this 3D silhouette with MRI data, body volume and fat distribution can be calculated.

=== Skin folds ===
Body composition can also be measured using the skin fold test, which is performed using a measuring caliper. It can be done in nine steps:

1. Take measurements on the right side of the body.
2. Mark client up.
3. Pinch skin (KM) above mark
4. Pull fat away from muscles
5. Place caliper halfway between top and bottom of mark
6. Allow caliper to settle (1–2 seconds)
7. Take reading – repeat 15 seconds
8. Add up total (4) – average
9. Calculate body fat %

A common skin fold method is by using gun style calipers to measure the thickness of subcutaneous fat in multiple places on the body. This includes the abdominal area, the subscapular region, arms, buttocks and thighs. These measurements are then used to estimate total body fat.

=== Ultrasound ===
Ultrasound has also been used to measure subcutaneous fat thickness, and by using multiple points an estimation of body composition can be made. Ultrasound has the advantage of being able to also directly measure muscle thickness and quantify intramuscular fat. In the abdomen, ultrasonography is a useful tool for quantifying both subcutaneous and visceral fat. Ultrasonography has many advantages over CT scan and MRI as it is non-invasive and doesn't utilize ionizing radiation, making it more accessible to special populations.

=== Quantitative magnetic resonance ===
Quantitative magnetic resonance (QMR) applies a magnetic field to the body and measures the difference in relaxation rates of hydrogen atoms within fat versus lean mass. It functions similarly to magnetic resonance imaging (MRI) but instead of providing an image like MRI, QMR gives quantities of fat mass, lean mass, and total body water. QMR is also widely used for body composition analysis of animals, including laboratory animals like mice, and wildlife including birds.

=== Circumferences and other simple measurements ===
Assessment of somatic (skeletal) protein is typically determined by simple measurements and calculations, including mid-arm circumference (MAC), mid-arm muscle circumference (MAMC), and creatinine height ratio (CHI). Creatinine height ratio is calculated as 24-hour urine creatinine multiplied by 100 over the expected 24-hour urine creatinine for height. This calculation results in a percentage that can indicate protein depletion.

Many methods of determining body composition use the body weight as a measurement, determined via a weighing scale. Other details such as height and age can be correlated with other measures and are often used in estimation formulas.

== Validity ==
The methods above are each valid and notable in providing a measurement that can be used to determine the "true body composition" of the tested individual. However, each method does possess its own individual limitations, such as accuracy, precision, or expense, and the combination of methods also has limitations. Often, the relative change from one period to the next is most important; if an individual can maintain all factors as similar as possible, even a simple method such as weighing may give enough information to determine the true change in composition.

== Types of exercises ==
The ideal percent of body mass which should be fat depends on an individual's sex, age, and physical activity. For example, a female thirty year old will have a different ideal fat percentage than a male thirty year old. An athlete will have a different ideal than a non athlete, and it can depend on the sport.

The physical activities which can help decrease fat mass, increase lean mass, or both are the same for everybody. Aerobic exercise, also known as cardio (heart) exercise, decreases fat. High intensity interval training (HIIT) in particular helps decrease visceral fat. Visceral fat is near the internal organs, while subcutaneous fat is just under the skin. The former is more tightly associated with poor metabolic health. Bone and muscle strengthening exercise, also known as resistant training, decreases fat mass and increases lean mass at the same time, though it does better at the latter. In order to prevent injury from repetitive motion, people should do resistant training with different parts of their bodies on different days.

== See also ==
- Body fat percentage
- Body mass index
- Body volume index
