= Bwh =

BWH generally refers to the Bust/waist/hip measurements.

BWH, Bwh, or BWh could also refer to:

- BWh, the Köppen climate classification of hot deserts
- BWH, Bust/waist/hip measurements
- Brigham and Women's Hospital
- IATA code of Butterworth Airport in Malaysia
- Billion watt-hour
