= Steatopygia =

Human lower-body phenotype

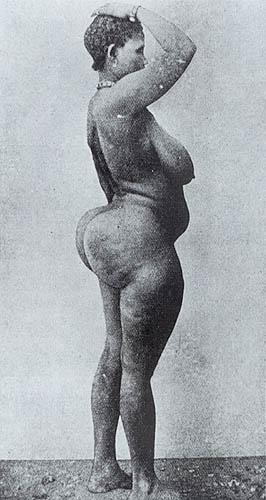
- A Khoisan woman displaying steatopygia
- Pronunciation: /ˌstiːætəˈpɪdʒ(i)ə, stiˌæ-, ˌstiːə-, -toʊ-, -ˈpiː-, -ˈpaɪ-/

Steatopygia is having substantial buttocks and thighs leading to a protruding 90-degree angled appearance and lordosis. This build extends to the outside and front of the thighs, and tapers to the knee producing a curvilinear figure. The term is from the Greek stéar (στέαρ), meaning "tallow", and pugḗ (πυγή), meaning "rump".

Steatopygia, a genetic phenotype leading to increased accumulation of adipose tissue in the buttock region, is most notably found among the Khoisan of Southern Africa. It has also been observed among Pygmies of Central Africa and the Andamanese people, such as the Onge tribe in the Andaman Islands. Cave and shelter paintings show that the trait existed among European and North African populations during the Upper Paleolithic. It is more common among women than men.

== Signs and symptoms ==
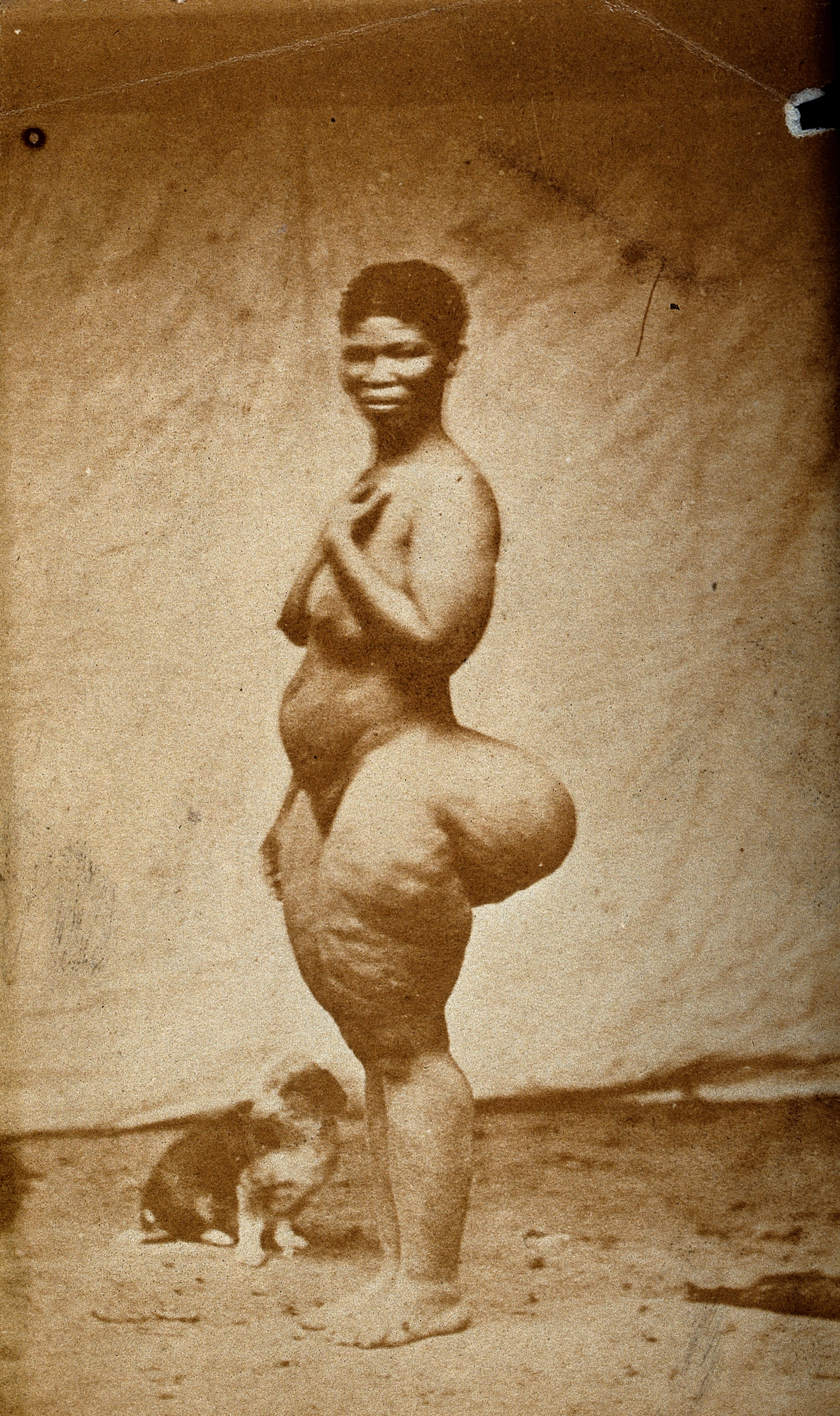
A woman exhibiting steatopygia

The shape of the posterior muscular and adipose tissues seems to correspond with the general pelvic morphology. The classification is as follows: the gynecoid pelvis corresponds to a round buttocks shape, the platypelloid pelvis to a triangle shape, the anthropoid pelvis to a square shape and the android pelvis to a trapezoidal gluteus region. The trapezoidal shape is what gives steatopygia its specific shape and appearance; if anything, steatopygia is a trapezoidal figure from front, sideways and the back.

Steatopygia increases the risk of gigantomastia in females and gynecomastia in males. It is also associated with inflammation to the genital area causing larger labia minora and labia majora in females ("macronympha") and giving males a larger penile girth and length. Steatopygia gives an athletic pear shape and triangle figure. Also gives an infantile oval and round face to both females and males.

== History ==
Paleolithic Venus figurines, sometimes referred to as "Steatopygian Venus" figures, discovered from Europe to Asia presenting a remarkable development of the thighs, and even the prolongation of the labia minora, have been used to support the condition's existence. Whether these were intended to be lifelike, exaggeratory, or idealistic is unclear. These figures, however, may not qualify as steatopygian, since they exhibit an angle of approximately 120 degrees between the back and the buttocks, while steatopygia is typically described with an angle of about 90 degrees only.

== Society and culture ==
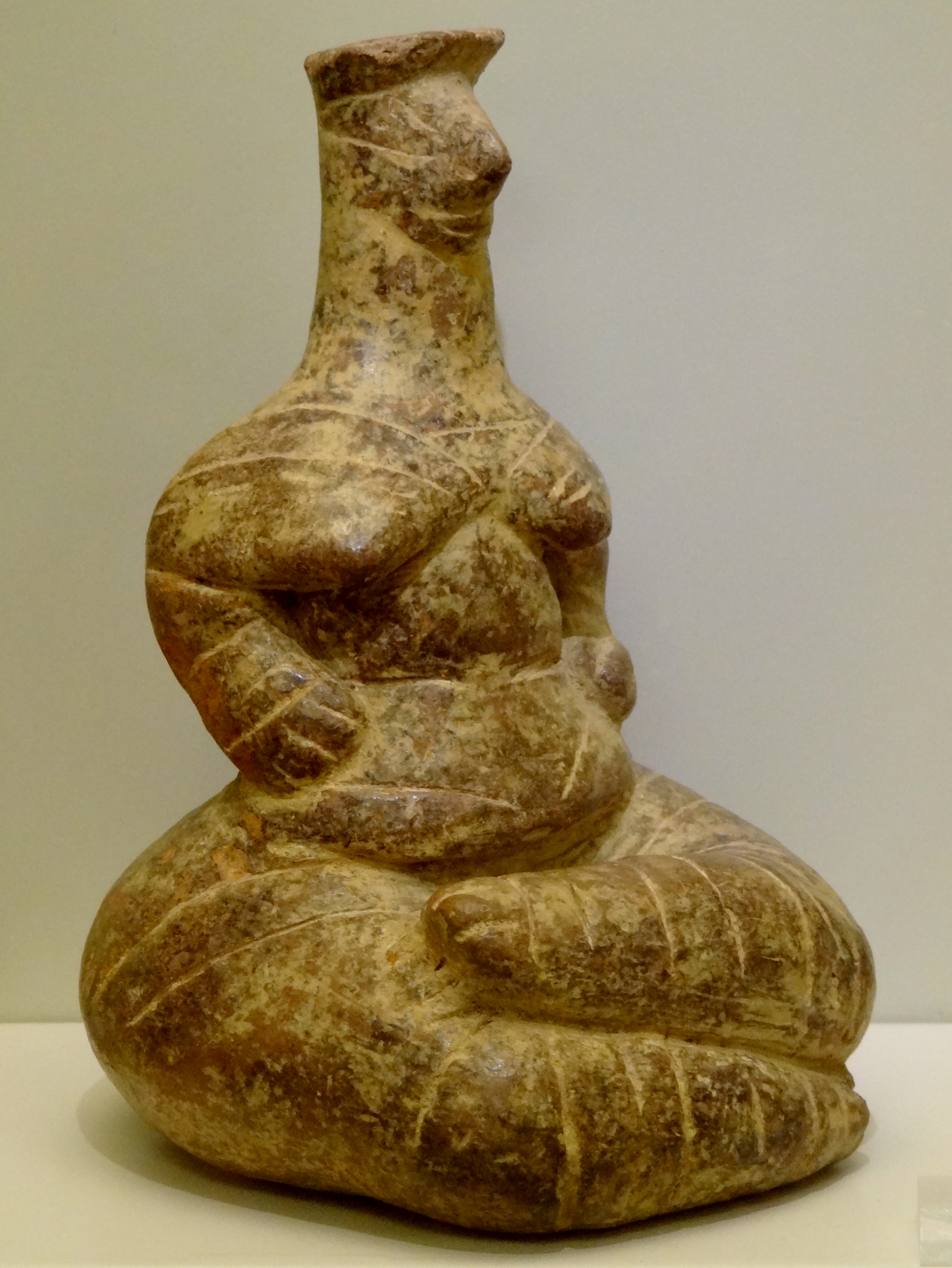
The Neolithic "Steatopygous Goddess from Pano Chorio", c. 5800–4800 BC, terracotta, Crete; whether she is really a goddess is uncertain.

Steatopygia is solely genetic.

In Georgian England, freak shows were known to have exploited women with steatopygia. The most well-known example was a South African Khoekhoe woman named Sarah Baartman, who is thought to have had lipedema.

== See also ==
- Big Beautiful Woman
- Female body shape
