= Hip and buttock padding =

Increases the apparent size of the hips and buttocks

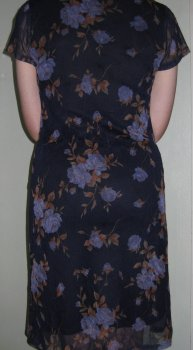
With padding

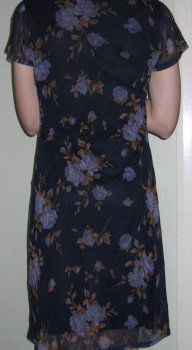
Without padding

Hip and buttock padding is used to increase the apparent size of the hips and buttocks in order to increase apparent waist-hip ratio which implies more feminine body shape. It is used by people of various genders: cis and trans women wishing to emphasize feminine curves and increase their physical attractiveness, and cross-dressers either to pass or create an exaggerated figure, as in drag performance. This technique is often used by drag queens to create the illusion of a feminine figure, often taking it to the extreme for comedic value.

== History ==
People have altered their silhouettes via hip and buttock padding to achieve desired silhouette shapes for centuries. In the 1500s and 1600s in Europe, the bum roll, or roll farthingale, was used to widen the appearance of the hips in contrast to the wearer's waist and create a fashionable feminine figure. Crinolines and hoop skirts were used in the 1800s, emphasizing a rounded full lower silhouette, and later a conical lower silhouette, with volume shifting towards the back. These were replaced by bustles, which appeared in 1868, and focused on keeping a flat silhouette in front while adding volume to the back.

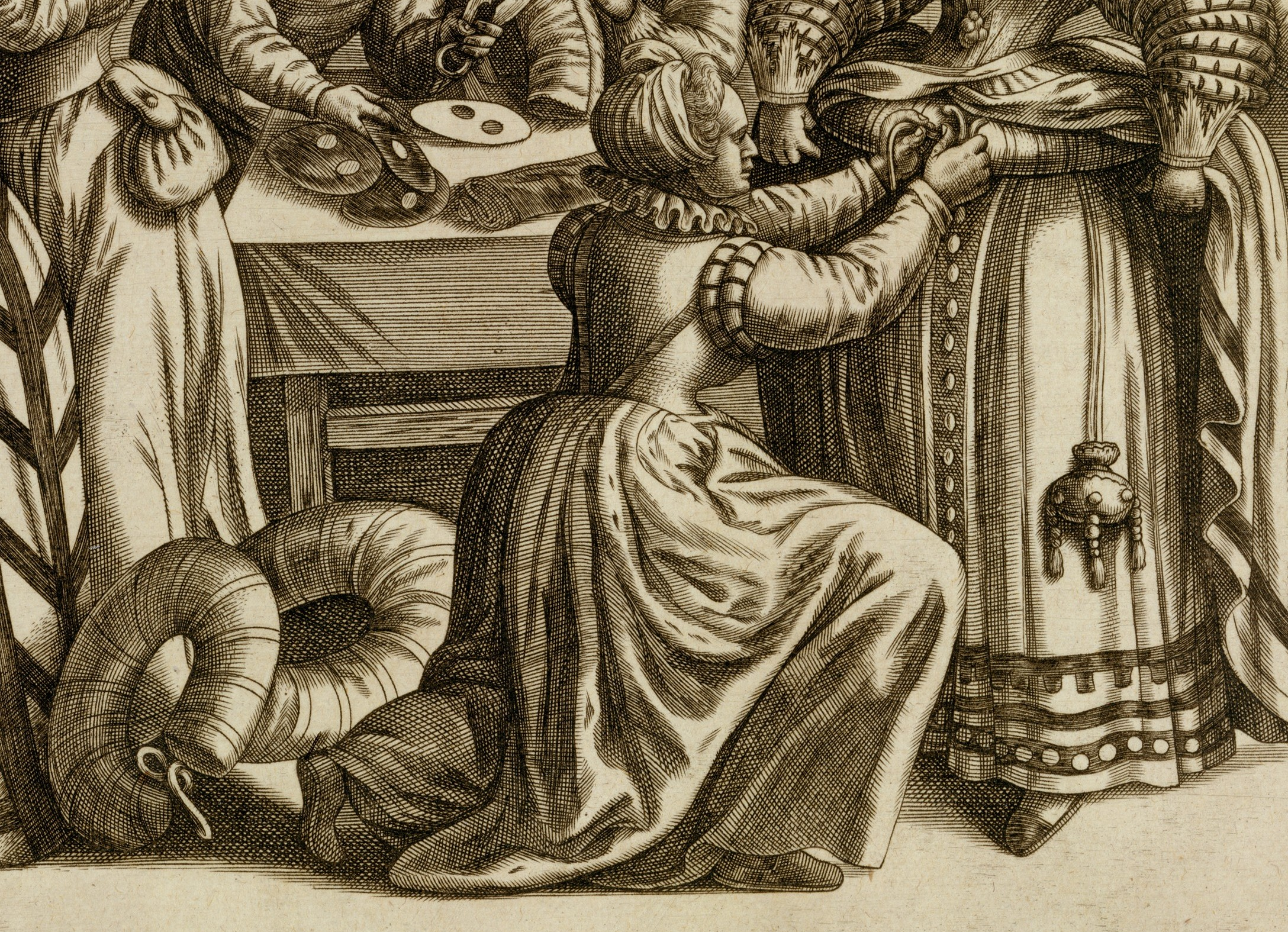
Detail on a 1600 satirical engraving showing Dutch women putting on padded rolls to shape their dresses.

In the 1960s, American women's undergarment fashions transitioned from shapewear and girdles to simple panties. However, the subculture of straight trans women's fashion focused strongly on shapewear in the form of breast forms and hip pads, as well as corsets and girdles. Breast forms, waist-cinchers and corsets were the most frequent ads shown in transfeminine periodicals like Transvestia during the 20th century. However, columnists frequently recommended hip and buttock padding as a way for cross-dressers and trans women to achieve proportions they had recorded as "normal" for women. Writers suggested hip and buttock padding for use in blending in and also for creating exaggerated feminine silhouettes.

Hip and buttock padding are a common element used by drag queens, used to create the silhouette of round buttocks and hips. One Texan drag queen recounted that in the early 2000s, it was hard to learn costume and makeup techniques unless you were taught by other queens. He said that he initially didn't use hip pads and would pad a bra with rags, but two local queens taught him techniques including the use of foam pads. He has used foam ever since to be "filled out properly." Today, YouTube tutorials and RuPaul's Drag Race shape educations in drag. In the 2022 season of RuPaul's Drag Race: UK vs The World, most of the contestants used foam padding in their looks to make their hips look larger.

Cosplayers use hip and buttock padding to construct hyper-masculine and hyper-feminine silhouettes, whether cross-dressing or not. These practices often borrow from cross-dressing and costume techniques shared by drag performers.

== Garment types ==
These garments can be broadly classed as pre-made, made to measure, and homemade.

=== Pre-made ===
Padded underwear with pockets into which sections of padding can be inserted are marketed by companies catering to crossdressers. Many of these premade garments are often criticised for looking lumpy or false.

=== Made to measure ===
At least one company specialises in manufacturing custom made garments specifically designed from the purchaser's measurements. These garments are more expensive than pre-made or homemade garments but are generally well made.

=== Homemade ===
The cheapest form of hip and buttock padding is homemade. Information on making padding is available on web sites and in at least one book.

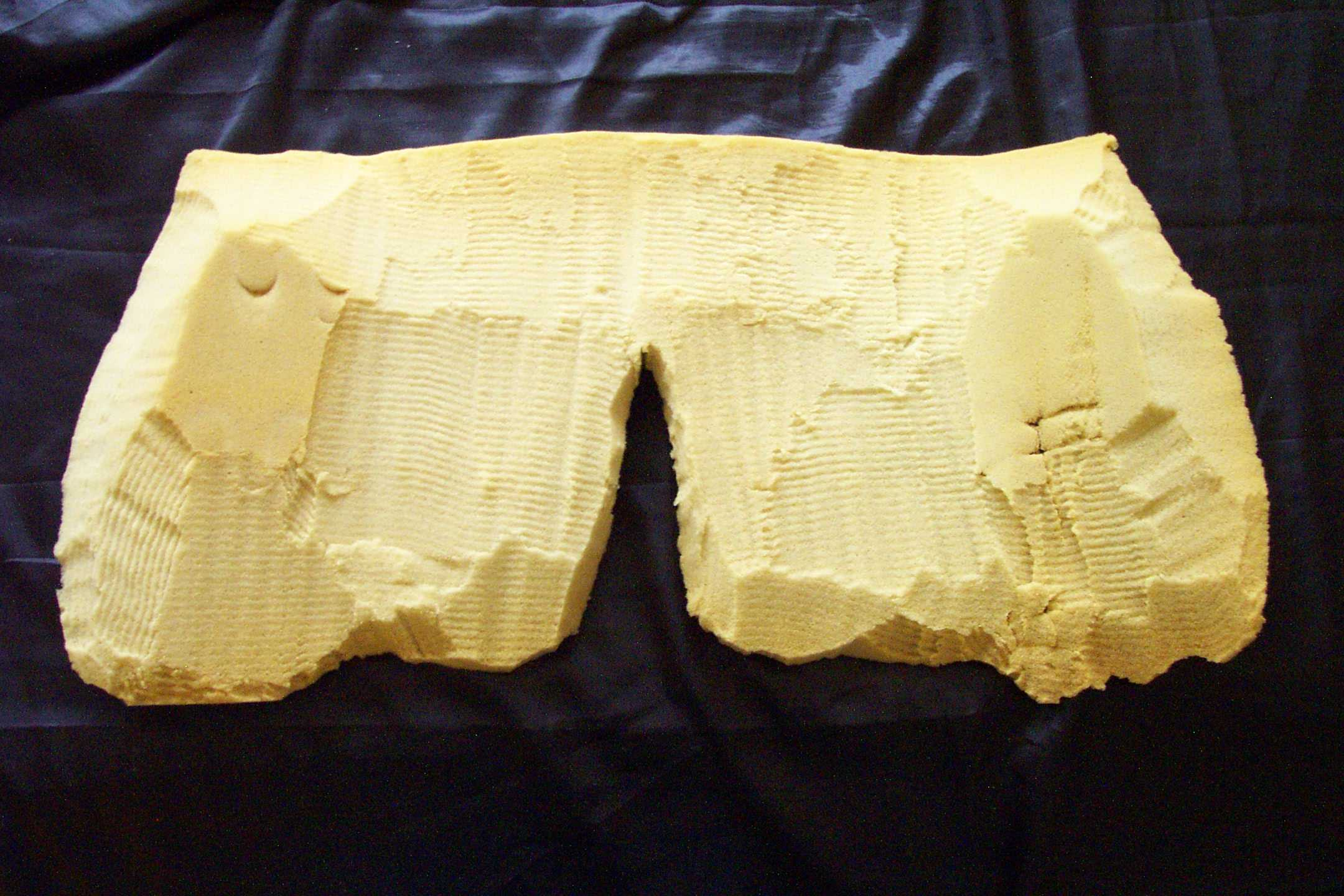
Home made padding

Using the person's own measurements and a table of comparative measurements, it is possible to determine how thick the padding needs to be at various places, such as the widest point on the hips and the fullest point on the buttocks.

Homemade padding is usually made by cutting a block of high-density polyurethane foam rubber to shape. This is the same type of foam as used for upholstery. The most common tool used for shaping the foam for this application is an electric knife. The block is usually cut as a flat piece which is wrapped around the hips and buttocks, rather than being carved as a curved piece. The foam is carved only on the inside, so that the outside surface remains smooth.

The padding is usually worn inside a compression garment such as one intended to be worn by females to lift and shape the buttocks.

== See also ==
- Cleavage enhancement
