= Female body shape =

Characteristic of human females

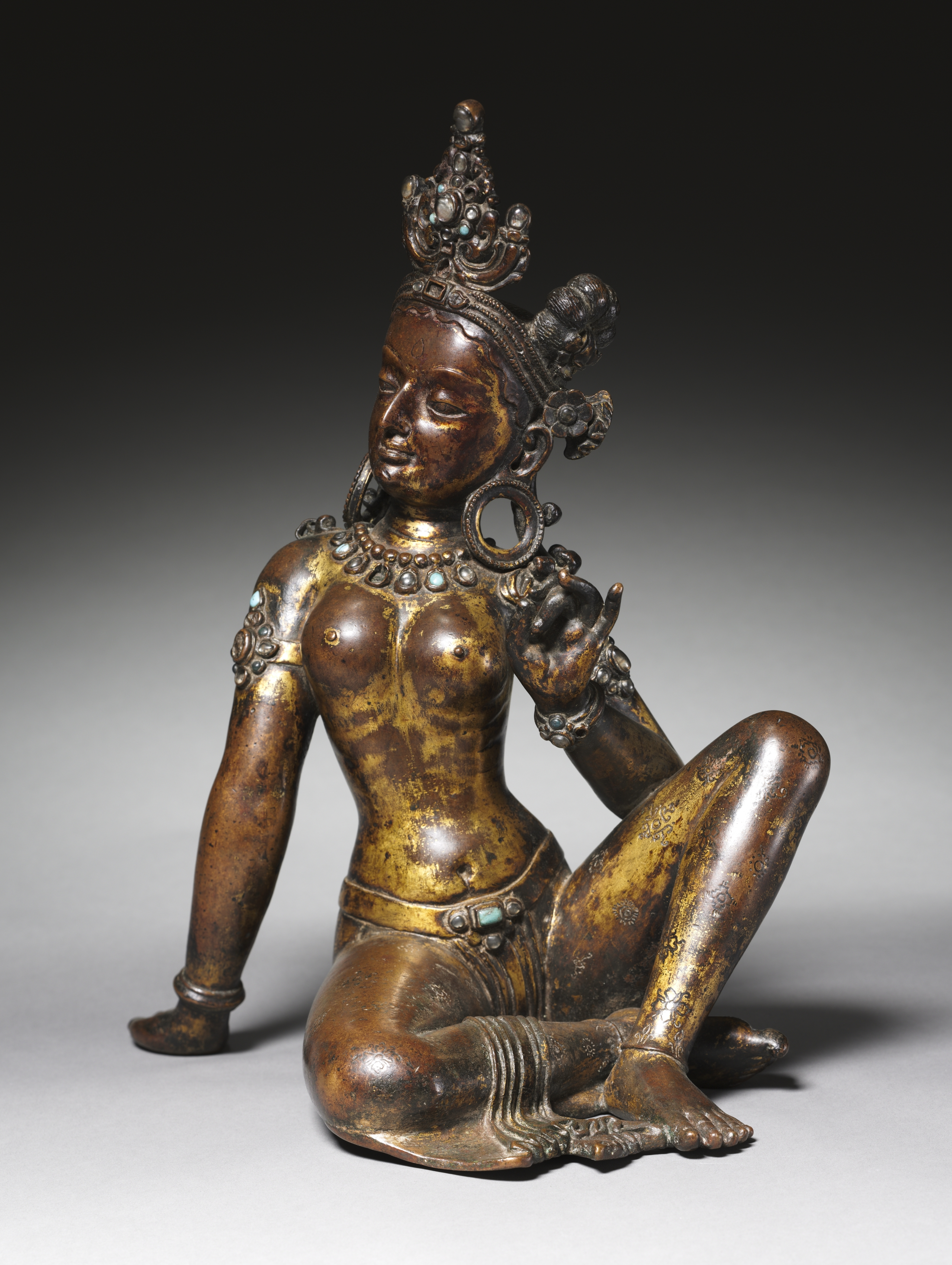
Uma, a Hindu goddess (Nepal, 11th century)

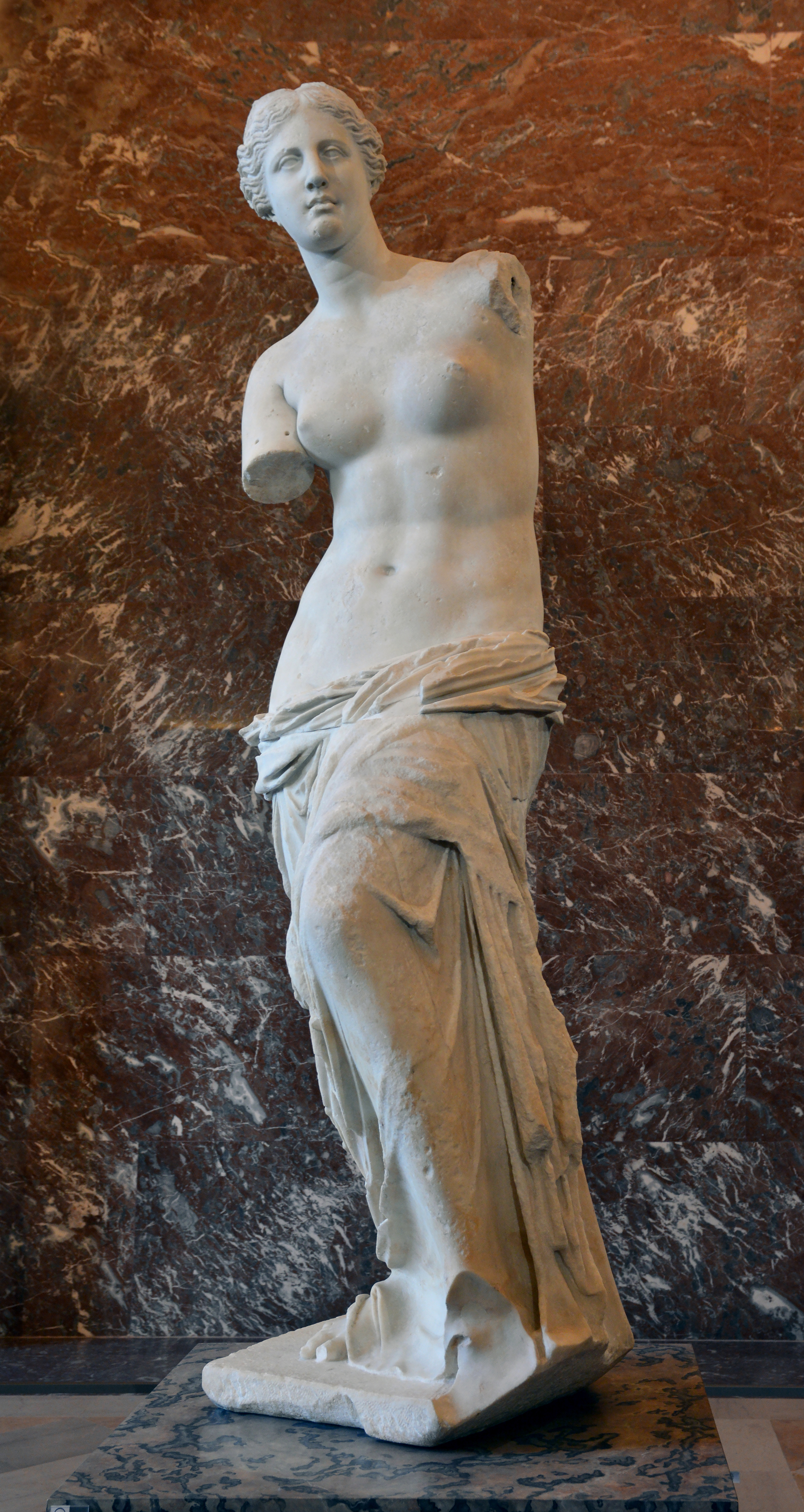
Venus de Milo (Greece, about 150 BCE)

Female body shape or female figure is the cumulative product of a woman's bone structure along with the distribution of muscle and fat on the body.

Female figures are typically narrower at the waist than at the bust and hips. The bust, waist, and hips are called inflection points, and the ratios of their circumferences are used to define basic body shapes.

Reflecting the wide range of individual beliefs on what is best for physical health and what is preferred aesthetically, there is no universally acknowledged ideal female body shape. Ideals may also vary across different cultures, and they may exert influence on how a woman perceives her own body image.

== Physiology ==
=== Impact of estrogens ===
Estrogens, which are primary female sex hormones, have a significant impact on a female's body shape. They are produced in both men and women, but their levels are significantly higher in women, especially in those of reproductive age. Besides other functions, estrogens promote the development of female secondary sexual characteristics, such as breasts and hips. As a result of estrogens, during puberty, girls develop breasts and their hips widen. Working against estrogen, the presence of testosterone in a pubescent female inhibits breast development and promotes muscle and facial hair development.

Estrogen levels also rise significantly during pregnancy. A number of other changes typically occur during pregnancy, including enlargement and increased firmness of the breasts, mainly due to hypertrophy of the mammary gland in response to the hormone prolactin. The size of the nipples may increase noticeably. These changes may continue during breastfeeding. Breasts generally revert to approximately their previous size after pregnancy, although there may be some increased sagging.

Breasts can decrease in size at menopause if estrogen levels decline.

=== Fat distribution ===
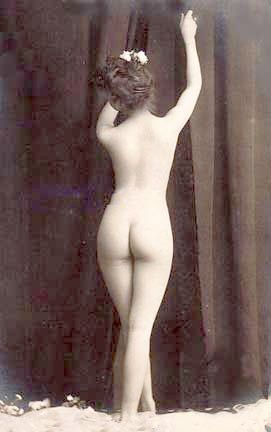
Estrogen causes fat to be stored on a young woman's buttocks, hips and thighs, but not her waist.

Estrogens can also affect the female body shape in a number of other ways, including increasing fat stores, accelerating metabolism, reducing muscle mass, and increasing bone formation.

Estrogens cause higher levels of fat to be stored in a female body than in a male body. They also affect body fat distribution, causing fat to be stored in the buttocks, thighs, and hips in women, but generally not around their waists, which will remain about the same size as they were before puberty. The hormones produced by the thyroid gland regulate the rate of metabolism, controlling how quickly the body uses energy, and controls how sensitive the body should be to other hormones. Body fat distribution may change from time to time, depending on food habits, activity levels and hormone levels.

When women reach menopause and the estrogen produced by ovaries declines, fat migrates from their buttocks, hips and thighs to their waists; later fat is stored at the abdomen.

Body fat percentage recommendations are higher for females, as this fat may serve as an energy reserve for pregnancy. Males have less subcutaneous fat in their faces due to the effects of testosterone; testosterone also reduces fat by aiding fast metabolism. The lack of estrogen in males generally results in more fat being deposited around the waist and abdomen (producing an "apple shape").

=== Muscles ===
Testosterone is a steroid hormone which helps build and maintain muscles for physical activity, such as exercise. The amount of testosterone produced varies from one individual to another, but, on average, an adult female produces around one-eighth of the testosterone of an adult male, but females are more sensitive to the hormone.

=== Changes to body shape ===
The aging process has an inevitable impact on a person's body shape. A woman's sex hormone levels will affect the fat distribution on her body. According to Dr. Devendra Singh, "Body shape is determined by the nature of body fat distribution that, in turn, is significantly correlated with women's sex hormone profile, risk for disease, and reproductive capability." Concentrations of estrogen will influence where body fat is stored.

Before puberty both males and females have a similar waist–hip ratio. At puberty, a girl's sex hormones, mainly estrogen, will promote breast development and a wider pelvis that is tilted forward, and until menopause a woman's estrogen levels will cause her body to store excess fat in the buttocks, hips and thighs, but generally not around her waist, which will remain about the same size as it was before puberty. These factors result in women's waist–hip ratio (WHR) being lower than for males, although males tend to have a greater upper-body to waist–hip ratio (WHR) giving them a V-shape look because of their greater muscle mass (e.g., they generally have much larger, more muscular and broader shoulders, pectoral muscles, teres major muscles and latissimus dorsi muscles).

During and after pregnancy, a woman experiences body shape changes. After menopause, with the reduced production of estrogen by the ovaries, there is a tendency for fat to redistribute from a female's buttocks, hips and thighs to her waist or abdomen.

The breasts of girls and women in early stages of development commonly are "high" and rounded, dome- or cone-shaped, and protrude almost horizontally from a female's chest wall. Over time, the sag on breasts tends to increase due to their natural weight, the relaxation of support structures, and aging.

== Categorisation in fashion industry ==
Body shapes are often categorised in the fashion industry into one of four elementary geometric shapes, though there are very wide ranges of actual sizes within each shape:

Rectangular

The waist is less than 9 in (23 cm) smaller than the hips and bust. Body fat is distributed predominantly in the abdomen, buttocks, chest, and face. This overall fat distribution creates the typical ruler (straight) shape.

Inverted triangle

The shoulders are broader than the hips. The legs and thighs tend to be slim, while the chest looks larger compared with the rest of the body. Fat is mainly distributed in the chest and face.

Spoon

The hips are wider than the bust. The distribution of fat varies, with fat tending to deposit first in the buttocks, hips, and thighs. As body fat percentage increases, an increasing proportion of body fat is distributed around the waist and upper abdomen. The women of this body type tend to have a relatively larger rear, thicker thighs, and a small(er) bosom. Also known as a "pear" shape.

Hourglass

The hips and bust are almost of equal size, and the waist is narrower than both. Body fat distribution tends to be around both the upper body and lower body.

A study of the shapes of over 6,000 women, carried out by researchers at the North Carolina State University circa 2005, for apparel, found that 46% were rectangular, just over 20% spoon, just under 14% inverted triangle, and 8% hourglass. Another study has found "that the average woman's waistline had expanded by six inches since the 1950s" and that women in 2004 were taller and had bigger busts and hips than those of the 1950s. However, a 2021 study found that slight changes in measurement placement definition can recategorise up to 40% of women into different body shapes, meaning cross-research comparisons may be flawed unless the exact measurement definitions are used.

Several similar classifications of women's body shape exist. These include:

- Sheldon: "Somatotype: {Plumper: Endomorph, Muscular: Mesomorph, Slender: Ectomorph}", 1940s
- Douty's "Body Build Scale: {1,2,3,4,5}", 1968
- Bonnie August's "Body I.D. Scale: {A,X,H,V,W,Y,T,O,b,d,i,r}", 1981
- Simmons, Istook, & Devarajan "Female Figure Identification Technique (FFIT): {Hourglass, Bottom Hourglass, Top Hourglass, Spoon, Rectangle, Diamond, Oval, Triangle, Inverted Triangle}", 2002
- Connell's "Body Shape Assessment Scale: {Hourglass, Pear, Rectangle, Inverted Triangle}", 2006
- Rasband: {Ideal, Triangular, Inverted Triangular, Rectangular, Hourglass, Diamond, Tubular, Rounded}, 2006
- Lee JY, Istook CL, Nam YJ, "Comparison of body shape between USA and Korean women: {Hourglass, Bottom Hourglass, Top Hourglass, Spoon, Triangle, Inverted Triangle, Rectangle}", 2007.

=== FFIT for Apparel measurements ===
The "Female Figure Identification Technique for Apparel" uses the following formula to identify an individual's body type:

Hourglass
If (bust − hips) ≤ 1 in (25 mm) AND (hips − bust) < 3.6 in (91 mm) AND ((bust − waist) ≥ 9 in (230 mm) OR (hips − waist) ≥ 10 in (250 mm))
Bottom hourglass
If (hips − bust) ≥ 3.6 in (91 mm) AND (hips − bust) < 10 in (250 mm) AND (hips − waist) ≥ 9 in (230 mm) AND (high hip/waist) < 1.193
Top hourglass
If (bust − hips) > 1 in (25 mm) AND (bust − hips) < 10 in (250 mm) AND (bust − waist) ≥ 9 in (230 mm)
Spoon
If (hips − bust) > 2 in (51 mm) AND (hips − waist) ≥ 7 in (180 mm) AND (high hip/waist) ≥ 1.193
Triangle
If (hips − bust) ≥ 3.6 in (91 mm) AND (hips − waist) < 9 in (230 mm)
Inverted triangle
If (bust − hips) ≥ 3.6 in (91 mm) AND (bust − waist) < 9 in (230 mm)
Rectangle
If (hips − bust) < 3.6 in (91 mm) AND (bust − hips) < 3.6 in (91 mm) AND (bust − waist) < 9 in (230 mm) AND (hips − waist) < 10 in (250 mm)

=== Clothing standards ===
Some clothing size standards define categories.

==== Inverted triangle-rectangular categories ====
The Chinese clothing size standards give codes to clothing designed for different ratios between chest and waist. They adapt for a linear scale between inverted triangle/hourglass and rectangular.

Chinese [GB/T1335.1—1997] Body Shape Classifications by: Chest - Waist circumferences
Shape Code	Female	Male
Y	19–24 cm	17–22 cm
A	14–18 cm	12–16 cm
B	9–13 cm	7–11 cm
C	4–8 cm	2–6 cm

==== Rectangular-spoon categories ====
The Japanese and South Korean clothing size standards give codes to women's clothing designed for different ratios between hips and chest. The German standards similarly use hip and bust measures. They all adapt for a linear scale between rectangular and spoon shapes.

Japanese [JIS L 4005 - 2001] Body Shape Classifications by: Hip - Chest circumferences
Shape Code	Female
Y	0 cm
A	4 cm
AB	8 cm
B	12 cm

South Korean [KS K 0051:2004] Body Shape Classifications by: Hip - Chest circumferences
Shape Code	Female
H	0–3 cm
N	3–9 cm
A	9–12 cm

German Body Shape Classifications by: Hip - Bust circumferences
Shape Code	Female
S	-4–2 cm
M	2–8 cm
L	8+ cm

The German sizing system also has height categories for short, regular and tall women, which combine with the shape categories to produce 9 categories.

== Proportions and dimensions ==
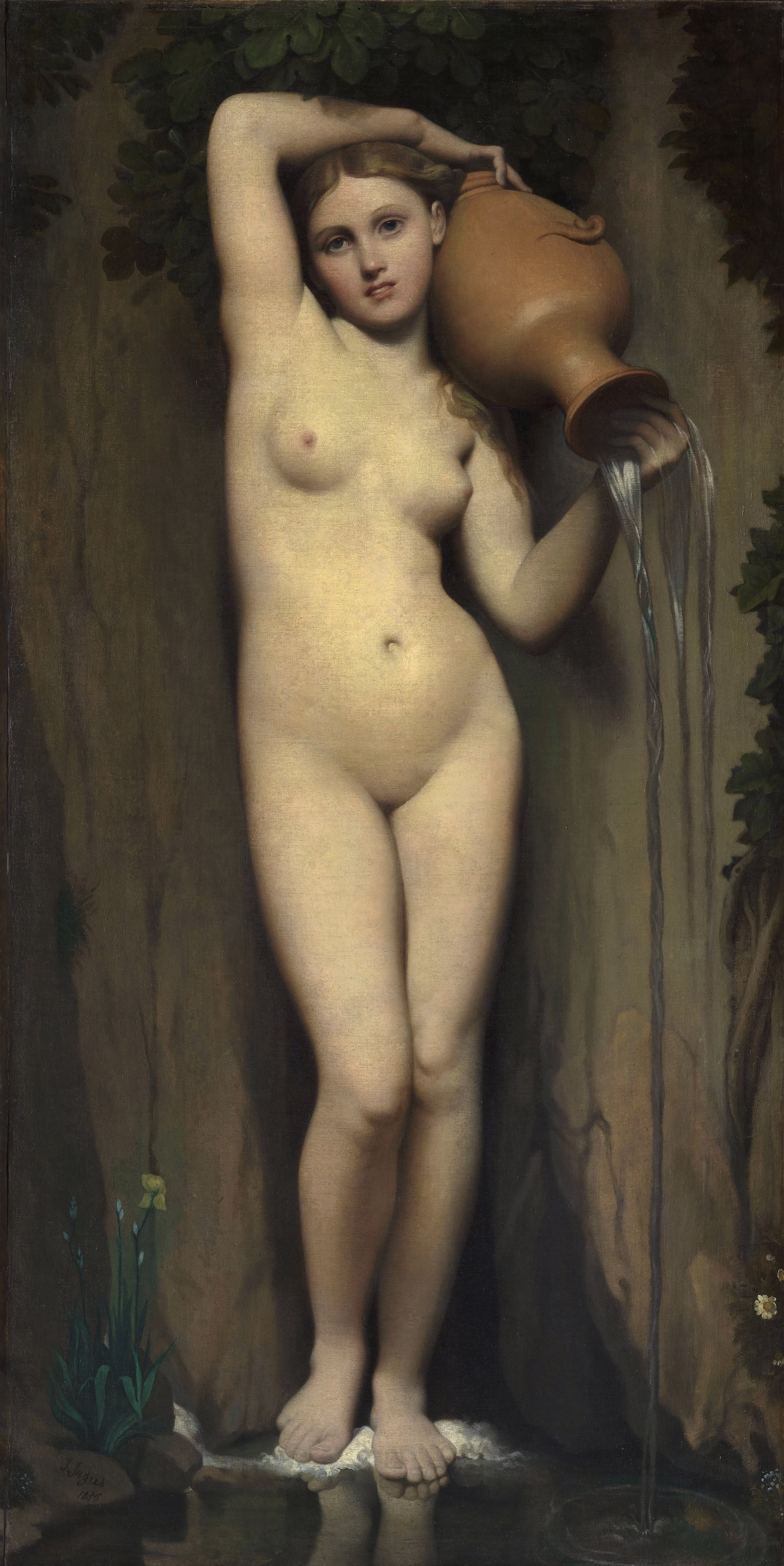
The Source, Jean Auguste Dominique Ingres, 1856

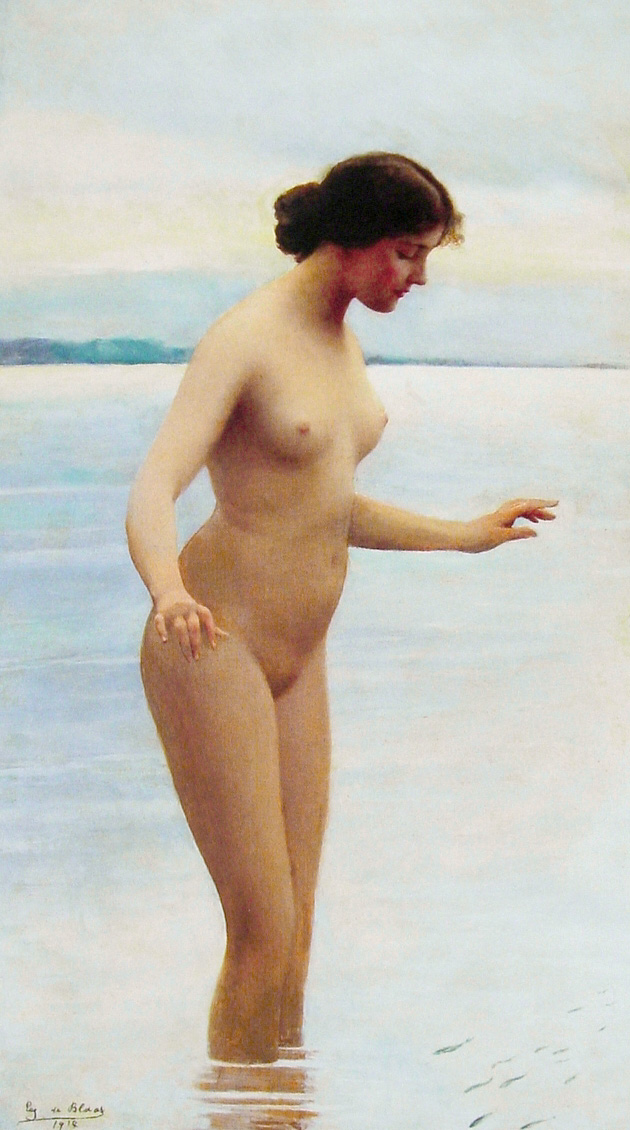
In the Water by Eugene de Blaas, 1914

The circumferences of bust, waist, and hips (BWH) and the ratios between them are a widespread method of identifying different female body shapes. As noted above, descriptive terms used include "rectangle", "spoon", "inverted triangle", and "hourglass".

The waist is typically smaller than the bust and hips, unless there is a high proportion of body fat distributed around it. How much the bust or hips inflect inward, towards the waist, determines a woman's structural shape. The hourglass shape is present in only about 8% of women.

A woman's dimensions are often expressed by the circumference around the three inflection points. For example, "36–29–38" in US customary units would mean a 36 in (91 cm) bust, 29 in (74 cm) waist and 38 in (97 cm) hips.

Height will also affect the appearance of the figure. A woman who is 36–24–36 (91–61–91 cm) at 5 ft 2 in (1.57 m) height will look different from a woman who is 36–24–36 at 5 ft 8 in (1.73 m) height. If both are the same weight, the taller woman has a much lower body mass index; if they have the same BMI, the weight is distributed around a greater volume.

A woman's bust measure is a combination of her rib cage and breast size. For convenience, a woman's bra measurements are often used as a proxy. Conventionally, measurement for the band of a bra is taken around the torso immediately below the breasts, with the tape measure parallel to the floor. Bra cup size is determined by measuring across the crest of the breasts and calculating the difference between that measurement and the band measurement. The waist is measured at the midpoint between the bottom of the rib cage and the top of the 'front' hip bones. The hips are measured at the largest circumference of the hips and buttocks.

=== Fashion models ===
The British Fashion Model Agents Association (BFMA) says that female models should be at least 5 ft 8 in (1.73 m) tall and proportionately around 34–24–34" (86–61–86 cm). Laws "aimed at preventing anorexia by stopping the promotion of inaccessible ideals of beauty" have been introduced in a number of European countries, to regulate the minimum actual or apparent BMI of fashion models. "Under World Health Organisation guidelines an adult with a BMI below 18.5 is considered underweight, 18 malnourished, and 17 severely malnourished. The average model measuring 1.75 m (5 ft 9 in) and weighing 50 kg (110 lb; 7 st 12 lb) has a BMI of 16".

== Cultural perceptions ==
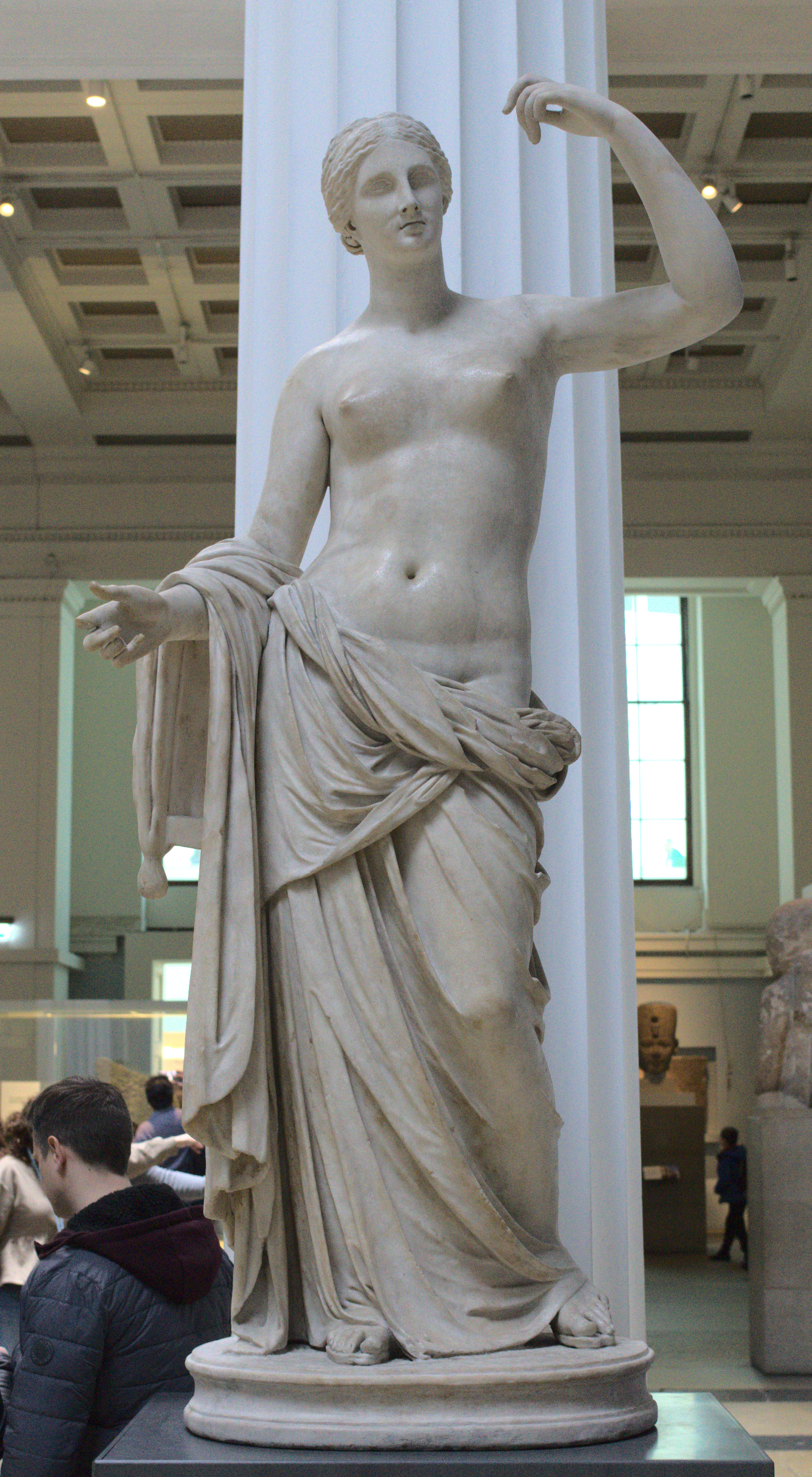
The Townley Venus, Roman marble copy (1st or 2nd century AD) of the Greek original (4th century BC)

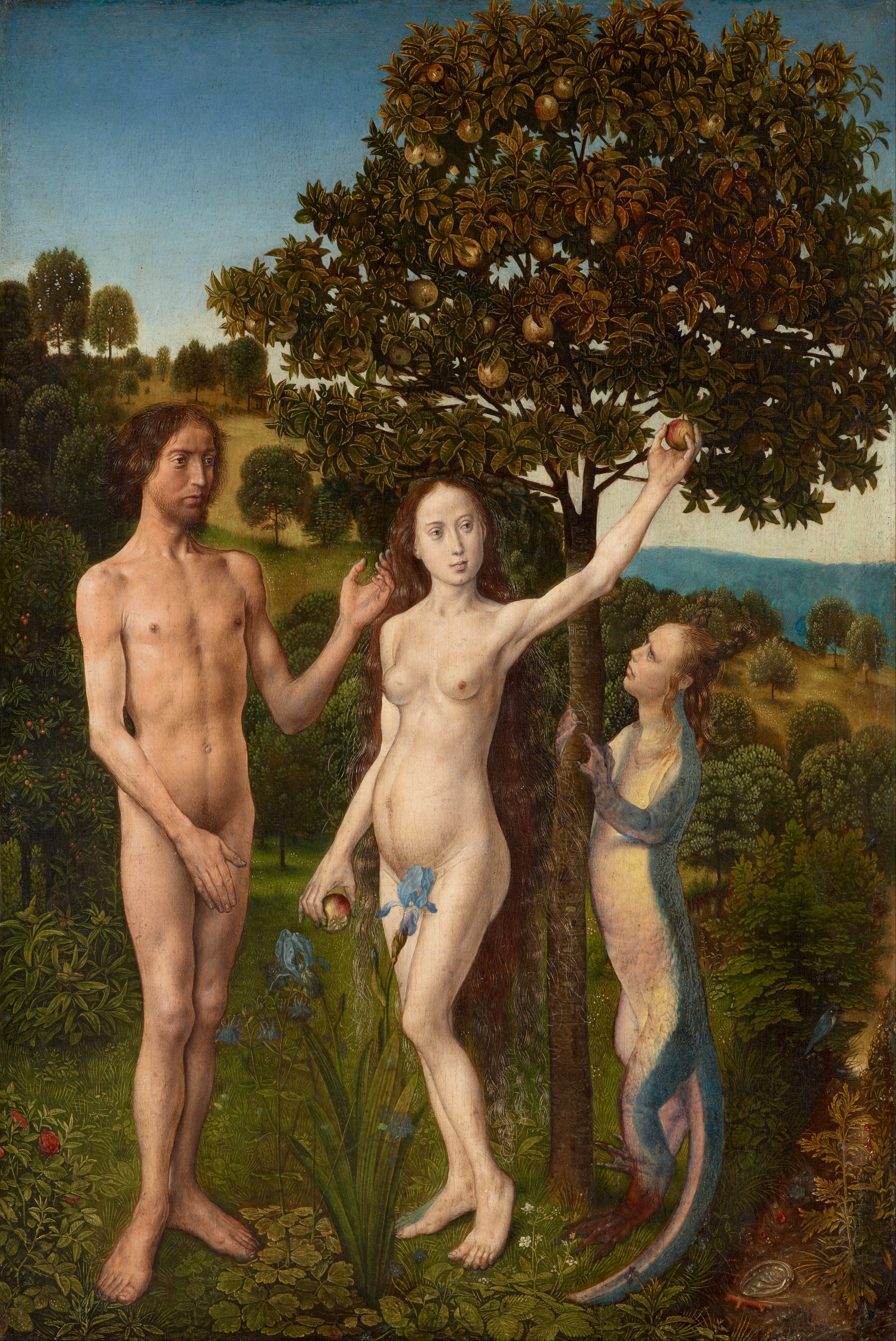
Adam and Eve from the Vienna Diptych by Hugo van der Goes. Eve's protruding abdomen is typical of nudes in the 15th century.

According to Camille Paglia, the ideal body type as envisioned by members of society has changed throughout history. She states that Stone Age Venus figurines show the earliest body type preference, dramatic steatopygia; and that the emphasis on protruding belly, breasts, and buttocks is likely a result of both the aesthetic of being well fed and aesthetic of being fertile, traits that were more difficult to achieve at the time. In sculptures from Classical Greece and Ancient Rome the female bodies are more tubular and regularly proportioned. There is essentially no emphasis given to any particular body part, not the breasts, buttocks, or belly.

Moving forward there is more evidence that fashion somewhat dictated what people believed were the proper female body proportions. This is the case because the body is primarily seen through clothing, which always changes the way the underlying structures are conceived. The first representations of truly fashionable women appear in the 14th century. Between the 14th and 16th centuries in northern Europe, bulging bellies were again desirable; however, the stature of the rest of the figure was generally thin. This is most easily visible in paintings of nudes from the time. When looking at clothed images, the belly is often visible through a mass of otherwise concealing, billowing, loose robes. Since the stomach was the only visible anatomical feature, it became exaggerated in nude depictions while the rest of the body remained minimal. In southern Europe, around the time of the renaissance, this was also true. Though the classical aesthetic was being revived and very closely studied, the art produced in the time period was influenced by both factors. This resulted in a beauty standard that reconciled the two aesthetics by using classically proportioned figures who had non-classical amounts of flesh and soft, padded skin.

In the nude paintings of the 17th century, such as those by Rubens, the naked women appear quite plump. Upon closer inspection, however, most of the women have fairly normal statures, Rubens has simply painted their flesh with rolls and ripples that otherwise would not be there. This may be a reflection of the female style of the day: a long, cylindrical, gown with rippling satin accents, tailored over a figure in stays. Thus Rubens' women have a tubular body with rippling embellishments. While stays continued to be fashionable into the 18th century, they were shortened, became more conical, and consequently began to emphasize the waist. It also lifted and separated the breasts as opposed to the 17th century corsets which compressed and minimized the breasts. Consequently, depictions of nude women in the 18th century tend to have a very narrow waist and high, distinct breasts, almost as if they were wearing an invisible corset. La maja desnuda is a clear example of this aesthetic. The 19th century maintained the general figure of the 18th century. Examples can be seen in the works of many contemporary artists, both academic artists, such as Cabanel, Ingres, and Bouguereau, and Impressionists, such as Degas, Renoir, and Toulouse-Lautrec. As the 20th century began, the rise of athletics resulted in a drastic slimming of the female figure. This culminated in the 1920s flapper look, which has informed modern fashion ever since.

The last 100 years envelop the time period in which that overall body type has been seen as attractive, though there have been small changes within the period as well. The 1920s was the time in which the overall silhouette of the ideal body slimmed down. There was dramatic flattening of the entire body resulting in a more youthful aesthetic. As the century progressed, the ideal size of both the breasts and buttocks increased. From the 1950s to 1960 that trend continued with the interesting twist of cone shaped breasts as a result of the popularity of the bullet bra. In the 1960s, the invention of the miniskirt as well as the increased acceptability of pants for women, prompted the idealization of the long leg that has lasted to this day. Following the invention of the push-up bra in the 1970s the ideal breast has been a rounded, fuller, and larger breast. In the past 20 years the average American bra size has increased from 34B to 34DD, although this may be due to the increase in obesity within the United States in recent years. Additionally, the ideal figure has favored an ever-lower waist–hip ratio, especially with the advent and progression of digital editing software such as Adobe Photoshop.

== Social and health issues ==
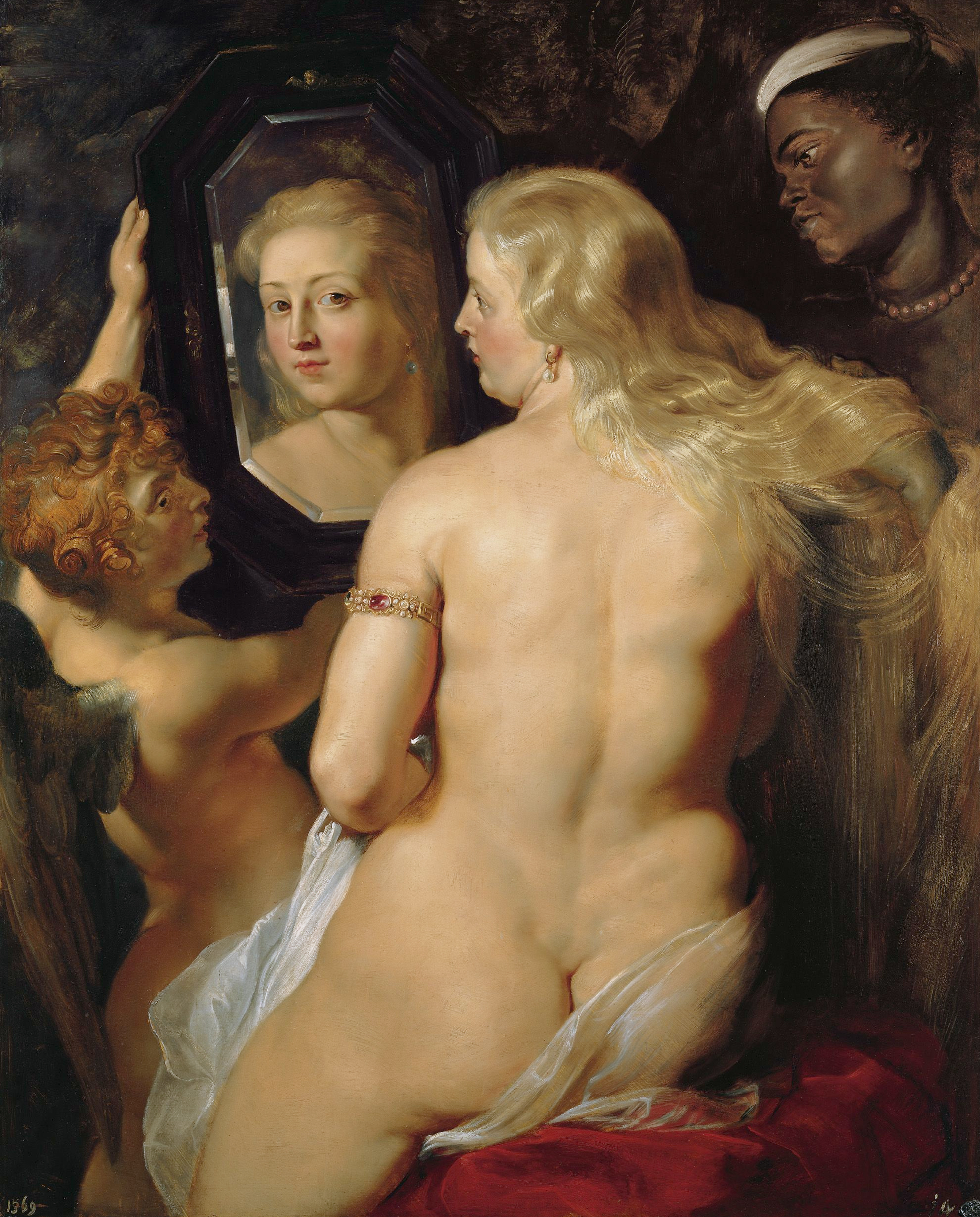
Venus at a Mirror, Rubens, c. 1615

Each society develops a general perception of what an ideal female body shape would be like. These ideals are generally reflected in the art and literature produced by or for a society, as well as in popular media such as films and magazines. The ideal or preferred female body size and shape has varied over time and continues to vary among cultures; but a preference for a small waist has remained fairly constant throughout history. A low waist–hip ratio has often been seen as a sign of good health and reproductive potential.

A low waist–hip ratio has also often been regarded as an indicator of attractiveness of a woman, but recent research suggests that attractiveness is more correlated to body mass index than waist–hip ratio, contrary to previous belief. According to Dr. Devendra Singh of the University of Texas, who studied the representations of women, historically found there was a trend for slightly overweight women in the 17th and 18th centuries, as typified by the paintings of Rubens, but that in general there has been a preference for a slimmer waist in Western culture. He notes that "The finding that the writers describe a small waist as beautiful suggests instead that this body part—a known marker of health and fertility—is a core feature of feminine beauty that transcends ethnic differences and cultures."

New research suggests that apple-shaped women have the highest risk of developing heart disease, while hourglass-shaped women have the lowest. Diabetes professionals advise that a waist measurement for a woman of over 80 cm (31 in) increases the risk of heart disease, but that ethnic background also plays a factor.

=== Waist–hip ratio ===
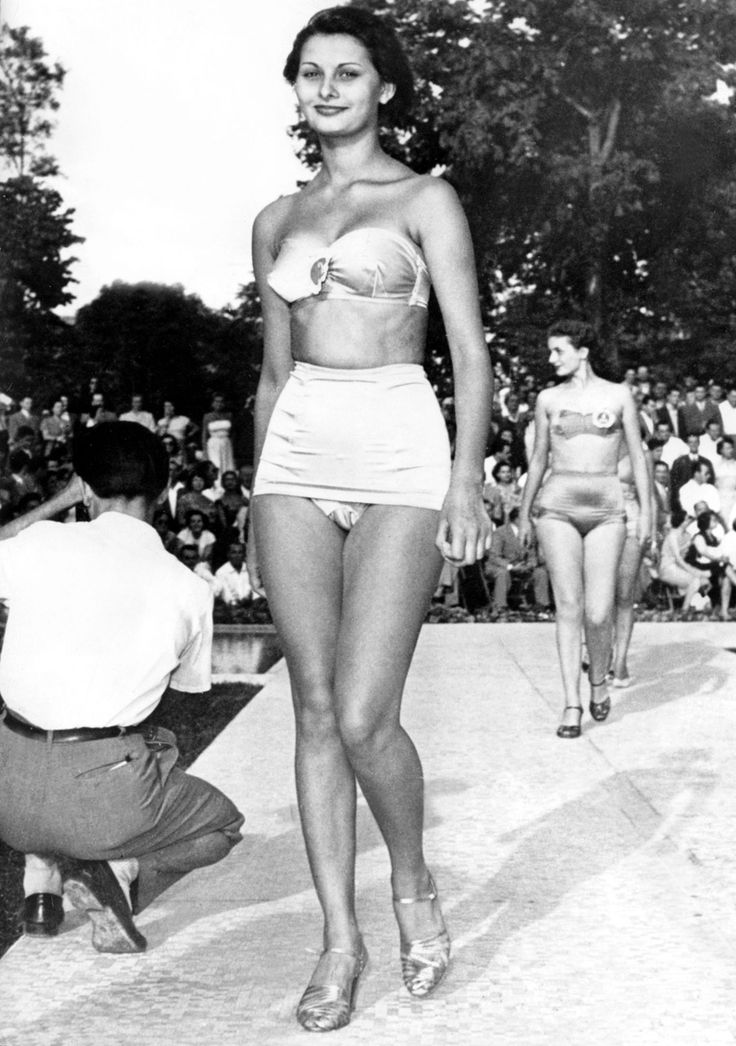
Sophia Loren in 1949

Compared to males, females generally have relatively narrow waists and large buttocks, and this along with wide hips make for a wider hip section and a lower waist–hip ratio. Research shows that a waist–hip ratio (WHR) for a female very strongly correlates to the perception of attractiveness. Women with a 0.7 WHR (waist circumference that is 70% of the hip circumference) are rated more attractive by men in various cultures. Such diverse beauty icons as Marilyn Monroe, Sophia Loren and the Venus de Milo have ratios around 0.7; this is a typical ratio in Western art. In other cultures, preferences vary, ranging from 0.6 in China, to 0.8 or 0.9 in parts of South America and Africa, and divergent preferences based on ethnicity, rather than nationality, have also been noted.

Anthropologists and behaviorists have discovered evidence that the WHR is a significant measure for female attractiveness.

Many studies indicate that WHR correlates with female fertility, leading some to speculate that its use as a sexual selection cue by men has an evolutionary basis. However, it is also suggested that the evident relationships between WHR-influencing hormones and survival-relevant traits such as competitiveness and stress tolerance may give a preference for higher waist–hip ratios its own evolutionary benefit. That, in turn, may account for the cross-cultural variation observed in actual average waist–hip ratios and culturally preferred waist-to-hip ratios for women.

WHR has been found to be a more efficient predictor of mortality in older people than waist circumference or body mass index (BMI).

=== Waist-to-height ratio ===
A person's "waist-to-height ratio" (WHtR), is defined as their waist circumference divided by their height, both measured in the same units. It is used as a predictor of obesity-related cardiovascular disease. The WHtR is a measure of the distribution of body fat. Higher values of WHtR indicate higher risk of obesity-related cardiovascular diseases; it is correlated with abdominal obesity. In September 2022, the UK's National Institute for Health and Care Excellence (a government body) announced new guidelines which suggested that all adults "ensure their waist size is less than half their height in order to help stave off serious health problems". This guideline is independent of gender.

== Bodies as identity ==
Over the past several hundred years, there has been a shift towards viewing the body as part of one's identity – not in a purely physical way, but as a means of deeper self-expression. David Gauntlett, in his 2008 book, recognizes the importance of malleability in physical identity, stating, "the body is the outer expression of our self, to be improved and worked upon". One of the more key factors in creating the desire for a particular body shape – most notably for women – is the media, which has promoted a number of so-called "ideal" body shapes. Fashionable figures are often unrealistic and unattainable for much of the population, and their popularity tends to be short-lived due to their arbitrary nature.

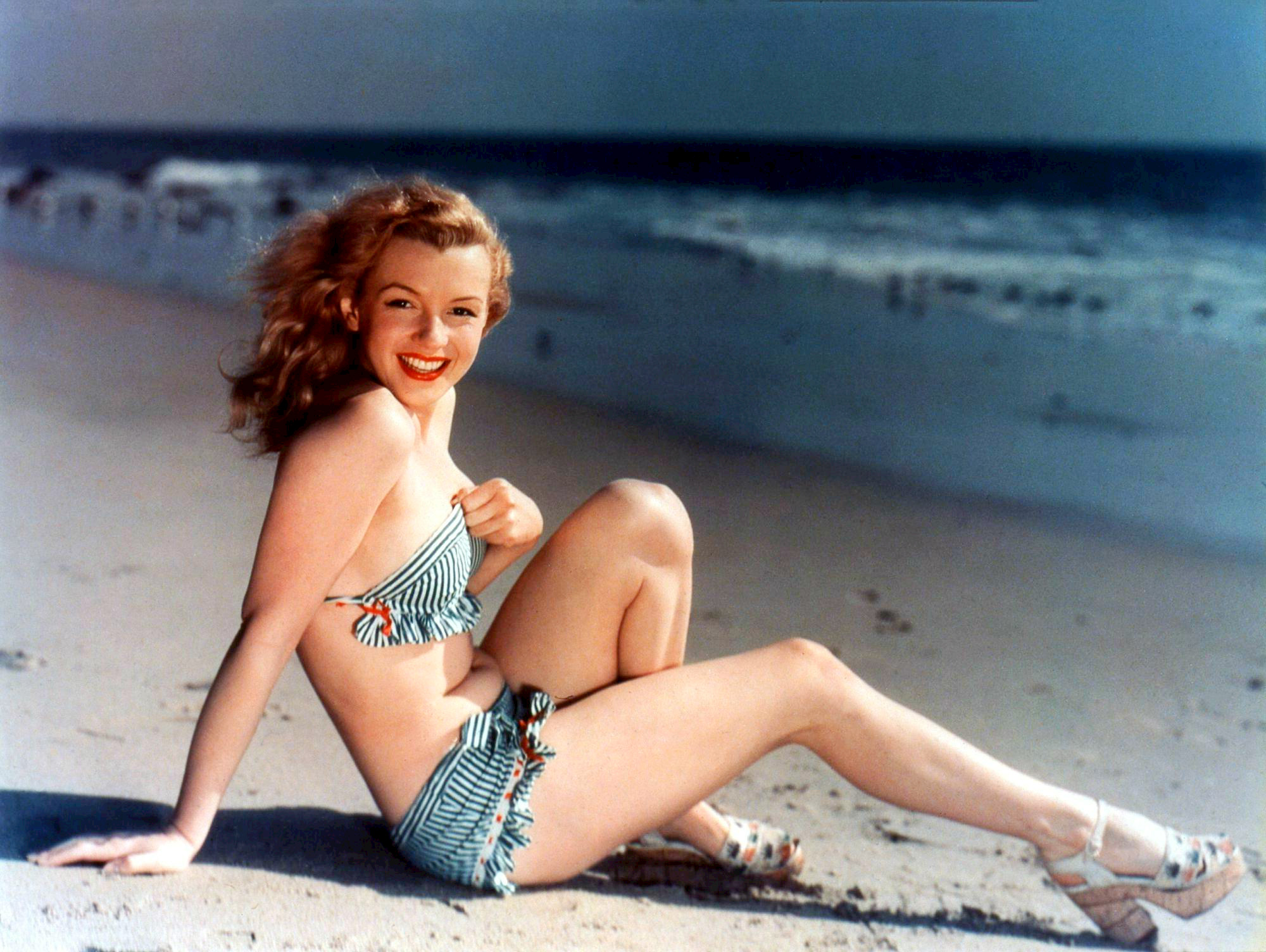
Postcard photo of the curvaceous Marilyn Monroe, taken before she became famous

During the 1950s, the fashion model and celebrity were two separate entities, allowing the body image of the time to be shaped more by television and film rather than high fashion advertisements. While the fashion model of the 1950s, such as Jean Patchett and Dovima, were very thin, the ideal image of beauty was still a larger one. As the fashion houses in the early 1950s still catered to a specific, elite clientele, the image of the fashion model at that time was not as sought after or looked up to as was the image of the celebrity. While the models that graced the covers of Vogue Magazine and Harper's Bazaar in the 1950s were in line with the thin ideal of the day, the most prominent female icon was Marilyn Monroe. Monroe, who was more curvaceous, fell on the opposite end of the feminine ideal spectrum in comparison to high fashion models. Regardless of their sizes, however, both fashion of the time and depictions of Monroe emphasize a smaller waist and fuller bottom half. The late 1950s, however, brought about the rise of ready-to-wear fashion, which implemented a standardized sizing system for all mass-produced clothing. While fashion houses, such as Dior and Chanel, remained true to their couture, tailor-made garments, the rise of these rapidly-produced, standardized garments led to a shift in location from Europe to America as the epicenter of fashion. Along with that shift came the standardization of sizes, in which garments were not made to fit the body anymore, but instead the body must be altered to fit the garment.

During the 1960s, the popularity of the model Twiggy meant that women favoured a thinner body, with long, slender limbs. This was a drastic change from the former decade's ideal, which saw curvier icons, such as Marilyn Monroe, to be considered the epitome of beautiful. These shifts in what was seen to be the "fashionable body" at the time followed no logical pattern, and the changes occurred so quickly that one shape was never in vogue for more than a decade. As is the case with fashion itself in the post-modern world, the premise of the ever-evolving "ideal" shape relies on the fact that it will soon become obsolete, and thus must continue changing to prevent itself from becoming uninteresting.

An early example of the body used as an identity marker occurred in the Victorian era, when women wore corsets to help themselves attain the body they wished to possess. Having a tiny waist was a sign of social status, as the wealthier women could afford to dress more extravagantly and sport items such as corsets to increase their physical attractiveness. By the 1920s, the cultural ideal had changed significantly as a result of the suffrage movement, and "the fashion was for cropped hair, flat (bound) breasts and a slim, androgynous shape".

More recently, magazines and other popular media have been criticized for promoting an unrealistic trend of thinness. David Gauntlett states that the media's "repetitive celebration of a beauty 'ideal' which most women will not be able to match … will eat up readers' time and money—and perhaps good health—if they try". Additionally, the impact that this has on women and their self-esteem is often a very negative one, and resulted in the diet industry taking off in the 1960s – something that would not have occurred "had bodily appearance not been so closely associated with identity for women". Melissa Oldman states, "Nowhere is the thin female ideal more evident than in popular media."

The importance of "the body as a work zone", as Myra MacDonald asserts, further perpetuates the link between fashion and identity, with the body being used as a means of creating a visible and unavoidable image for oneself. The tools with which to create the final copy of such a project range from the extreme—plastic surgery—to the more tame, such as diet and exercise.

== Alteration of body shape ==
A study at Brigham Young University using MRI technology suggested that women experience more anxiety about weight gain than do men, while aggregated research has been used to claim that images of thin women in popular media may induce psychological stress. A study of 52 older adults found that females may think more about their body shape and endorse thinner figures than men even into old age.

Various strategies, including exercise, are sometimes employed in an attempt to temporarily or permanently alter the shape of a body. Dieting is also sometimes used, but is generally not effective in the long term.

At times artificial devices are used or surgery is employed. In 2019, 92% of all cosmetic procedures in the US were undertaken by women, with the most popular being a breast augmentation. Breast size can be artificially increased or decreased. Falsies, breast prostheses or padded bras may be used to increase the apparent size of a woman's breasts, while minimiser bras may be used to reduce the apparent size. Breasts can be surgically enlarged using breast implants or reduced by the systematic removal of parts of the breasts. Hormonal breast enhancement may be another option.

Historically, boned corsets have been used to reduce waist sizes. The corset reached its climax during the Victorian era. In twentieth century these corsets were mostly replaced with more flexible/comfortable foundation garments. Where corsets are used for waist reduction, they may cause temporary reduction through occasional use or permanent reduction through constant and continuous use. Those who use corsets for permanent reduction are often referred to as tightlacers. Liposuction and liposculpture are common surgical methods for reducing the waist line.

Padded control briefs or hip and buttock padding may be used to increase the apparent size of hips and buttocks. Buttock augmentation surgery may be used to increase the size of hips and buttocks to make them look more rounded.

== Social perceptions of the ideal woman's body ==
In a 2012 experiment, researchers Crossley, Cornelissen, and Tovée asked men and women to depict an attractive female body, and the majority of them chose the same ideal. The women who participated in this experiment drew their ideal bodies with enlarged busts and narrowed the rest of their bodies. The male participants also depicted their ideal partner with the same image. The researchers state, "For both sexes, the primary predictor of female beauty is a relatively low BMI combined with a relatively curvaceous body". However, the generality of their conclusions was limited given their small sample size and single ethnicity of participants.

== See also ==
- Awoulaba – Woman epitomising West African beauty standards
- Body proportions – Proportions of the human body in art
  - Artistic canons of body proportions – Criteria used in formal figurative art
- Chinese ideals of female beauty – Beauty standards within China or overseas Chinese communities
- Human variability – Range of possible values for any characteristic of human beings
- Physical attractiveness – Aesthetic assessment of physical traits
- Sex differences in humans – Difference between males and females
- Somatotype and constitutional psychology – Taxonomy to categorize human physiques
- Steatopygia – Human lower-body phenotype

== Cited sources ==
- Gauntlett, David (2008). Media, gender, and identity. Abingdon, UK: Routledge. ISBN 978-0-415-18960-6.
- MacDonald, Myra (1995). Representing Women: Myths of Femininity in the Popular Media. London: Edward Arnold. ISBN 978-0-340-63221-5.
