= Bust/waist/hip measurements =

Measures used for fitting clothing

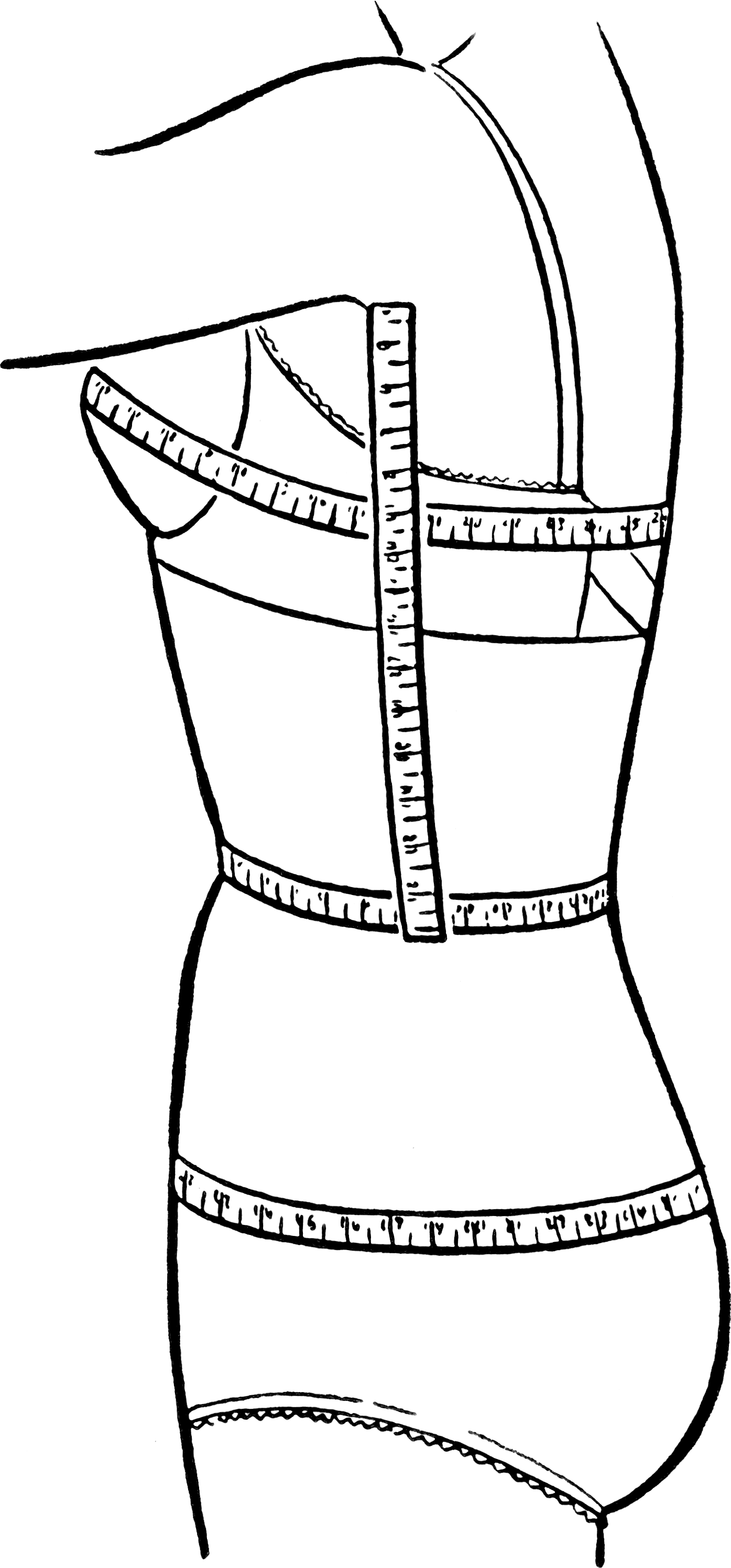
A corset diagram showing the lines of measurement for bust, waist, hip, and back underarm to waist

Bust/waist/hip measurements (informally called 'body measurements' or ′vital statistics′) are a common method of specifying clothing sizes. They match the three extrema of the female body shape. In human body measurement, these three sizes are the circumferences of the bust, waist and hips; usually rendered as xx–yy–zz in inches, or centimeters. The three sizes are used mostly in fashion, and almost exclusively in reference to women, who, compared to men, are more likely to have a narrow waist relative to their hips.

== Measurements and perception ==
Breast volume will have an effect on the perception of a woman's figure even when bust/waist/hip measurements are nominally the same. Brassière band size is measured below the breasts, not at the bust. A woman with measurements of 36A–27–38 will have a different presentation than a woman with measurements of 34C–27–38. These women have ribcage circumferences differing by 2 inches, but when breast tissue is included, the measurements are the same at 38 inches. The result is that the latter woman will appear "bustier" than the former due to the apparent difference in bust to hip ratios (narrower shoulders, more prominent breasts) even though they are both technically 38–27–38.

Height will also affect the presentation of the figure. A woman who is 36–24–36 (91.5–61–91.5) at 5 ft 3 in (1.60 m) tall looks different from a woman who is 36–24–36 at 5 ft 8 in (1.73 m) tall. Since the latter woman's figure has greater distance between measuring points, she will likely appear thinner than her former counterpart, again, even though they share the same measurements.

The specific proportions of 36–24–36 inches (90-60-90 centimeters) have frequently been given as the "hourglass" proportions for women since at least the 1960s (Note: These measurements are, for example, the title of the B-side of "Kon-Tiki", a 1961 instrumental by The Shadows)

== See also ==
- Female body shape
- Physical attractiveness
- Waist–hip ratio
- Waist-to-height ratio
