= Devendra Singh (psychologist) =

Indian psychologist (1938–2010)

Devendra Singh (January 12, 1938 – May 18, 2010) was a professor of Psychology at the University of Texas, known largely for his research regarding the evolutionary significance of human attraction.

== Biography ==
Singh was born in 1938 in Urai, India. Having first taken degrees in philosophy and psychology (Agra University), he completed his PhD at Ohio State University in 1966. Singh took up teaching positions at Wright State University and North Dakota State University before moving to the University of Texas at Austin in 1969.

A pioneer in the field of evolutionary psychology, Singh's most notable research concerned the evolutionary significance of waist-to-hip ratio (WHR). In 1993, he was the first to elucidate the concept and significance of this ratio as an indicator of attractiveness. In brief, Singh discovered that men rated women with low WHR (0.7) as optimally attractive, noting that lower levels of WHR correlated to lower risk of disease and greater fertility. Subsequent research demonstrated the cross-cultural and cross-temporal appeal of a low WHR. One of his final research papers on the topic of WHR found that the "hourglass figure" (optimal WHR) activates brain centers that drive appetitive sociality/attention toward females that represent the highest-quality reproductive partners.

Although principally affiliated with the field of evolutionary psychology, his other research pursuits included substance abuse, obesity, eating disorders, motivation, and the psychology of sex.
