= Waist–hip ratio =

Indicator of health or fertility

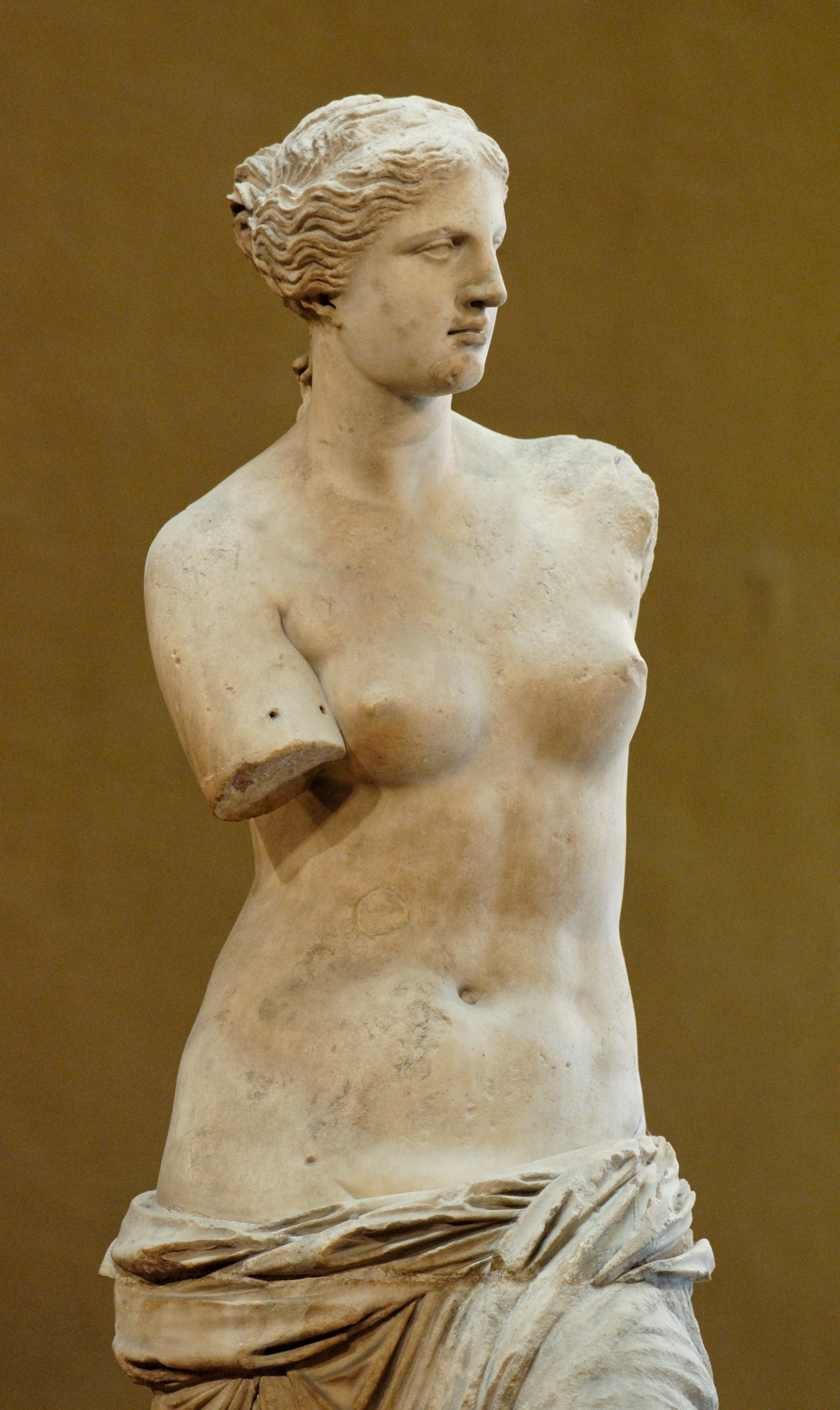
The Venus de Milo has a WHR value of 0.76.

The waist–hip ratio or waist-to-hip ratio (WHR) is the dimensionless ratio of the circumference of the waist to that of the hips. This is calculated as waist measurement divided by hip measurement (W/H). For example, a person with a 75 cm waist and 95 cm hips (or a 30-inch waist and 38-inch hips) has WHR of about 0.79.

The WHR has been used as an indicator or measure of health, fertility, and the risk of developing serious health conditions. WHR correlates with perceptions of physical attractiveness.

== Measurement ==
Example of a 0.7 WHR (left) compared to a ratio of 0.9 (right). In a lean person, the waist can be measured at its narrowest point, while for an obese person, it may be measured at about 3 cm above the navel. The hip is measured at its widest portion of the buttocks at left, and at the greater trochanters at right.

=== WHO protocol ===
According to the World Health Organization's data gathering protocol, the waist circumference should be measured at the midpoint between the lower margin of the last palpable ribs and the top of the iliac crest, using a stretch-resistant tape that provides constant 100 g (3.53 oz) tension. Hip circumference should be measured around the widest portion of the buttocks, with the tape parallel to the floor. Other organizations use slightly different standards. The United States National Institutes of Health and the National Health and Nutrition Examination Survey used results obtained by measuring at the top of the iliac crest.

For both measurements, the individual should stand with feet close together, arms at the side and body weight evenly distributed, and should wear little clothing. The subject should be relaxed, and the measurements should be taken at the end of a normal respiration. Each measurement should be repeated twice; if the measurements are within 1 cm of one another, the average should be calculated. If the difference between the two measurements exceeds 1 cm, the two measurements should be repeated.

=== Practical measurement ===
The layperson's measurement of hip circumference is the same as the WHO protocol: measure at the widest part of the buttocks or hip.

There are several possible alternative definitions of waist circumference with easier-to-locate landmarks:

1. Waist measurements are usually obtained by laypersons by measuring around the waist at the navel, but research has shown that these measurements may underestimate the true waist circumference.
2. In lean people, the waist is commonly measured at the smallest circumference of the natural waist, as indicated in the WHO report.
3. Where the waist is convex rather than concave, as in pregnancy and obesity, the waist may be measured at a vertical level 1 inch (2.5 cm) above the navel.
4. The NIH NHANES study measures at the top of the iliac crest, which is low but relatively easy to find.

== Indicator of health ==
=== Serious health conditions ===
The WHR has been used as an indicator or measure of health, and as a risk factor for developing serious health conditions.

WHR is used as a measurement of obesity, which in turn is a possible indicator of other more serious health conditions. The WHO states that abdominal obesity is defined as a waist–hip ratio above 0.90 for males and above 0.85 for females, or a body mass index (BMI) above 30.0. The National Institute of Diabetes and Digestive and Kidney Diseases (NIDDK) states that "total cholesterol levels are usually higher in persons with predominant abdominal obesity, defined as a waist-to-hip circumference ratio of ≥ 0.8 for women and ≥ 1.0 for men.

| | DGSP | | WHO | | NIDDK | |
| | Women | Men | Women | Men | Women | Men |
|---|---|---|---|---|---|---|
| under-weight | ? | ? | ? | ? | ? | ? |
| normal weight | < 0.80 | < 0.90 | ? | ? | ? | ? |
| over-weight | 0.80–0.84 | 0.90–0.99 | ? | ? | ? | ? |
| obese | > 0.85 | > 1.00 | > 0.85 | > 0.90 | > 0.80 | > 1.00 |

WHR has been found to be a more efficient predictor of mortality in older people (>75 years of age) than waist circumference or BMI. If obesity is redefined using WHR instead of BMI, the proportion of people categorized as at risk of heart attack worldwide increases threefold. WHR may be less accurate in individuals with a BMI of 35 or higher, and more complex to interpret since an increased WHR may result from increased abdominal fat or decreased lean muscle mass around the hips. The body fat percentage is considered to be an even more accurate measure of relative weight. Of these three measurements, only the waist–hip ratio takes account of the differences in body structure. Hence, it is possible for two people of the same sex to have different body mass indices but the same waist–hip ratio, or to have the same body mass index but different waist–hip ratios.

WHR has been shown to be a better predictor of cardiovascular disease than simple waist circumference and body-mass index. The study by American Heart Association has shown that measuring waistline and comparing it to hip size might be a better way to predict heart disease risk than a widely used body mass index. However, other studies have found waist circumference (particularly waist-to-height ratio) to be a better indicator of cardiovascular risk factors than the waist–hip ratio, body fat distribution, and hypertension in type 2 diabetes.

=== Stress ===
The stress hormone cortisol is regulated by the hypothalamic-pituitary-adrenal (HPA) axis and has been associated with higher levels of abdominal fat and therefore a higher WHR. Abdominal fat is a marker of visceral fat (stored around important internal organs such as the liver, pancreas and intestines) and has greater blood flow and more receptors for cortisol than peripheral fat. The greater the number of cortisol receptors, the more sensitive the visceral fat tissue is to cortisol. This heightened sensitivity to cortisol stimulates fat cells to further increase in size. Women who have a combination of normal BMI and high WHR experience elevated cortisol reactivity to acute stressors and failure to habituate to repeated stressors, compared to women with normal WHR. This suggests that high WHR might also indicate HPA-axis dysregulation and over-exposure to cortisol.

Evidence for the relationship between cortisol and central fat distribution has primarily been studied in individuals with Cushing's syndrome. This is characterized by over-exposure to cortisol due to elevated activity of the HPA axis. A primary component of Cushing's syndrome is the accumulation of fat in the abdominal region, and it is hypothesized that elevated cortisol levels contribute to this accumulation. However, this hypothesis remains contested as cortisol levels only modestly explain variation in central fat distribution. It is more likely that a complex set of biological and neuroendocrine pathways related to cortisol secretion contribute to central adiposity, such as leptin, neuropeptide y, corticotropin releasing factor and the sympathetic nervous system.

=== Growth and development ===
In general, adults with growth hormone deficiencies also have increased WHRs. Adults with untreated congenital isolated growth hormone deficiency have increased WHRs, possibly from increased cortisone–cortisol ratios and insulin sensitivities. Since these individuals have increased visceral obesity, it has been suggested that a minimal growth hormone secretion would theoretically increase insulin resistance. However, because of the growth hormone deficiency, this insulin resistance point cannot be reached and these individuals are more sensitive to insulin. Increased adipose deposits are therefore more likely to form in these individuals, causing the high WHR. Growth hormone deficiencies have also been correlated with WHRs in prepubertal children; the specific baseline body statistics, such as WHRs, of pre-pubertal children with growth hormone deficiencies can predict growth response effectiveness to artificial growth hormone therapies, such as rhGH treatments.

=== Sex characteristics ===
Males with congenital adrenal hyperplasia, determined by CYP21A2 mutations, have increased WHRs.

=== Fertility ===
Women with high WHR (0.80 or higher) have significantly lower pregnancy rates than women with lower WHRs (0.70–0.79), independent of their BMIs.

One of the factors that affects a woman's waist-hip ratio is her gynoid fat distribution, a store of energy to be expended in the nurturing of offspring, both to provide adequate energy resources during pregnancy and for the infant during the stage in which they are breastfeeding. In an ancestral environment where food was scarce, a female with high levels of gynoid fat would be signalling that she in an optimal state for reproduction and nurturing of offspring. This can be seen in the fact that a female's waist–hip ratio is at its optimal minimum during times of peak fertility—late adolescence and early adulthood, before increasing later in life.

As a female's capacity for reproduction comes to an end, the fat distribution within the female body begins a transition from the gynoid type to more of an android type distribution. This is evidenced by the percentages of android fat being far higher in post-menopausal than pre-menopausal women.

Evidence suggests that WHR is an accurate somatic indicator of reproductive endocrinological status and long-term health risk. Among girls with identical body weights, those with lower WHRs show earlier pubertal endocrine activity, as measured by high levels of lutenizing hormone and follicle-stimulating hormone, as well as sex steroid (estradiol) activity. A Dutch prospective study on outcome in an artificial insemination program provides evidence for the role of WHR and fecundity. These investigators report that a 0.1 unit increase in WHR decreases the probability of conception per cycle by 30% after adjustment for age, obesity, reasons for artificial insemination, cycle length and regularity, smoking, and parity.

Menopause, the natural or surgical cessation of the menstrual cycle, is due to an overall decrease in ovarian production of the hormones estradiol and progesterone. These hormonal changes are also associated with an increase in WHR independent of increases in body mass. Significantly, studies find that large premenopausal WHRs are associated with lower estradiol levels and variation in age of menopause onset. Circulating estrogen preferentially stores lipid deposits in the gluteofemoral region, including the buttocks and thighs, and evidence suggests that menopause-associated estrogen deficiency results in an accumulation of adipose deposits around the abdomen. These menopause-induced changes in body fat distribution can be counteracted with hormone replacement therapy. In contrast, aging males gradually accumulate abdominal fat, and hence increased WHR, in parallel with declining androgen levels.

=== Offspring cognitive ability ===
Using data from the U.S. National Center for Health Statistics, William Lassek at the University of Pittsburgh in Pennsylvania and Steven Gaulin of the University of California, Santa Barbara found a child's performance in cognitive tests correlated to their mother's waist–hip ratio, a proxy for how much fat she stores on her hips.

Children whose mothers had wide hips and a low waist–hip ratio scored highest, leading Lassek and Gaulin to suggest that fetuses benefit from hip fat, which contains long chain polyunsaturated fatty acids, critical for the development of the fetus's brain. In addition, evidence suggests that children of low-WHR teens were protected from the cognitive deficits often associated with teen birth.

=== Offspring newborn size ===
A higher WHR corresponds to a heavier baby with a longer body and a bigger head at birth.

== Human genetics ==
Studies in twins have suggested that between 22% and 61% of variability in waist-to-hip ratio may be accounted for by genetic factors.

== As an indicator of attractiveness ==
=== Female ===
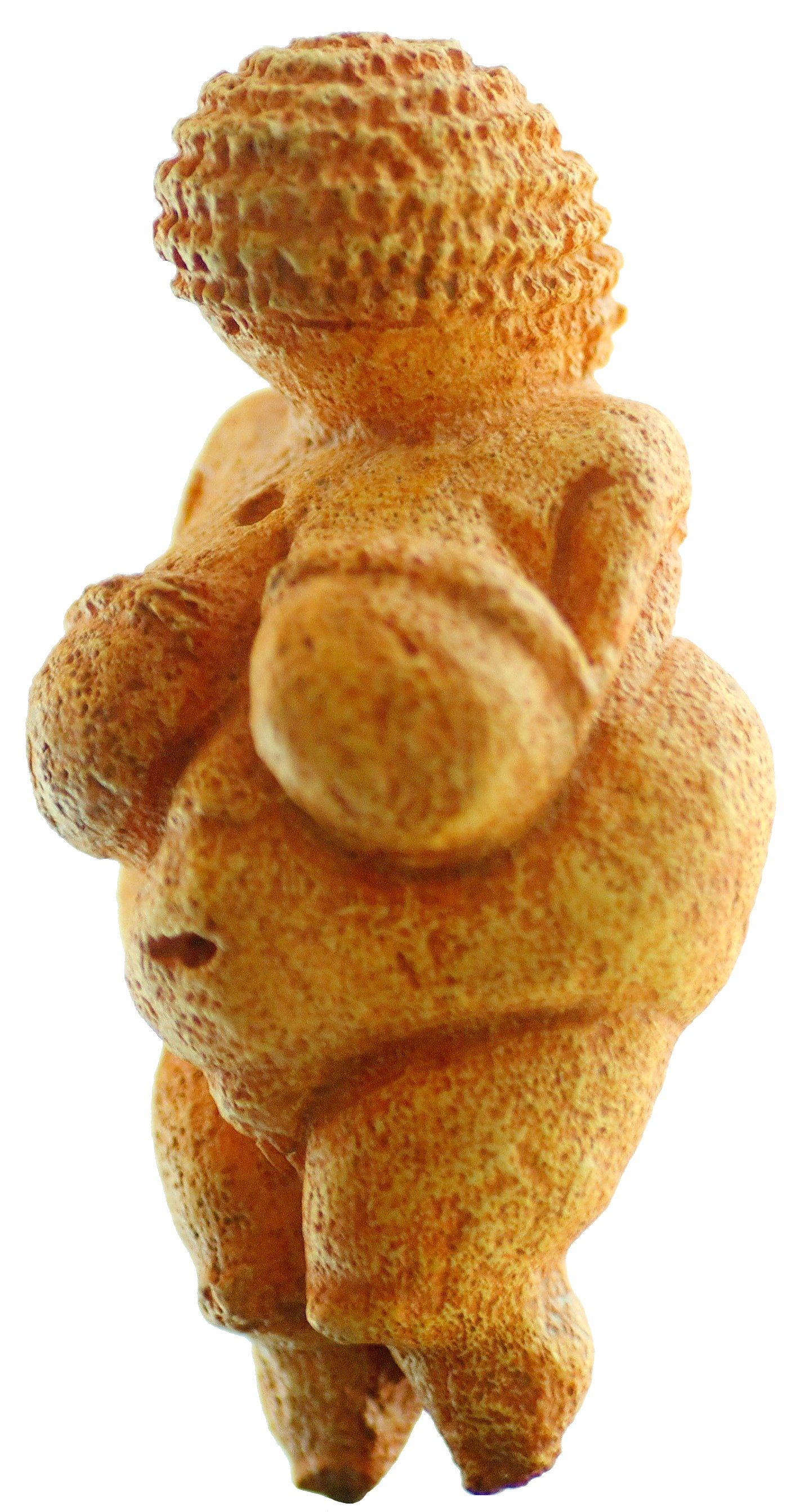
Venus of Willendorf. The earliest known representations of female figures date from 23,000 to 25,000 years ago and had bodies with vestigial head and limbs, noted for their very high waist–hip ratio of 1:1 or more. It may be that the artists' "depictions of corpulent, middle-aged females were not 'Venuses' in any conventional sense. They may, instead, have symbolized the hope for survival and longevity, within well-nourished and reproductively successful communities."

WHR is considered as one of the three determinants of female attractiveness, the other two being body mass index (BMI), and curviness. The concept and significance of WHR as an indicator of attractiveness was first theorized by evolutionary psychologist Devendra Singh at the University of Texas at Austin in 1993. Singh argued that the WHR was a more consistent estrogen marker than the bust–waist ratio (BWR) studied at King's College, London by Glenn Wilson in the 1970s.

Some researchers have found that the waist–hip ratio is a significant measure of female attractiveness. Women with a 0.7 WHR are usually rated as more attractive by men from various cultures. Preferences may vary, according to some studies, ranging from 0.6 in China, South America, and some of Africa to 0.8 in Cameroon and among the Hadza tribe of Tanzania, with divergent preferences according to the ethnicity of the observed being noted. In ancient Greek and Egyptian sculptures, idealized female representations typically displayed ratios of 0.7, while in Indian and African artwork, the WHRs for female statues are even smaller, at 0.6 and 0.5 respectively.

It appears that men in westernized societies are more influenced by female waist size than hip size: "Hip size indicates pelvic size and the amount of additional fat storage that can be used as a source of energy. Waist size conveys information such as current reproductive status or health status ... in westernized societies with no risk of seasonal lack of food, the waist, conveying information about fecundity and health status, will be more important than hip size for assessing a female's attractiveness".

By western standards, women in foraging populations have high numbers of pregnancies, high parasite loads, and high caloric dependence on fibrous foods. These variables change across cultures, suggesting that:

1. the normal range of female WHR was often higher than in western cultures,
2. what constituted locally "WHR" varied, and
3. average WHR of nubile females and of females of peak fertility varied.

Thus, a WHR that indicates pubertal onset, sex, fertility, hormonal irregularities, and/or differentiates male from female in one population may not do so in another.

In a series of 1993 studies done by Singh, men used WHR and overall body fat to determine a woman's attractiveness. In his first study, men were shown a series of 12 drawings of women with various WHRs and body fat. Drawings with normal weight and a low WHR were associated with the most positive traits (i.e. attractive, sexy, intelligent and healthy). The drawings of thin female figures were not associated with any positive traits except youthfulness.

Through this study, Singh suggests that males and females may have developed innate mechanisms which detect and make use of the WHR to assess how healthy an individual is and (particularly for men), infer possible mate value. Having a healthy mate improves the chances of producing offspring with inherited genetic protection from various diseases and a healthy mate is more likely to be a good parent (Hamilton & Zuk, 1982; Thornhill, 1993).

Other studies discovered WHR as a signal of attractiveness as well, beyond just examining body fat and fertility. Barnaby Dixson, Gina Grimshaw, Wayne Linklater, and Alan Dixson conducted a study using eye-tracking techniques to evaluate men's fixation on digitally altered photographs of the same woman, as well as asking the men to evaluate the images based on attractiveness. What they found was while men fixated on the woman's breasts in each photo, they selected the images where the woman had a 0.7 WHR as most attractive, regardless of breast size. Pazhoohi et al. (2019) using eye tracking confirmed that lower than optimal WHRs when posing in contrapposto, which causes one side of the body to have a lower than optimal view-dependent WHR, are perceived more attractive and are supernormal stimuli.

Furthermore, referencing a 2005 study conducted by Johnson and Tassinary looking at animated human walking stimuli, Farid Pazhoohi and James R. Liddle proposed that men do not solely use WHR to evaluate attractiveness, but also a means of sex-differentiation, with higher WHR perceived as more masculine and lower WHR as an indicator of femininity. Pazhoohi and Liddle used this idea as a possible additional explanation as to why men perceive a lower WHR as more attractive – because it relates to an expression of femininity, as opposed to masculinity and a higher WHR. On this basis, it was shown that men with lower, more feminine, WHRs feel less comfortable and self-report lower body esteem and self-efficacy than men with higher, more masculine, WHRs.

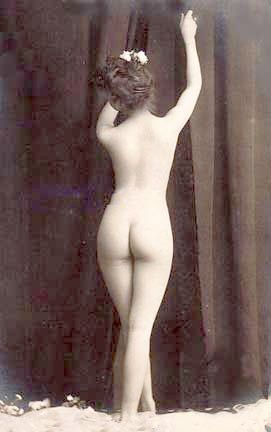
Women with a relatively low waist-hip ratio (the hourglass figure) is commonly considered attractive.

To enhance their perceived attractiveness, some women may artificially alter their apparent WHR. The methods include the use of a corset to reduce the waist size and hip and buttock padding to increase the apparent size of the hips and buttocks. In an earlier attempt to quantify attractiveness, corset and girdle manufacturers of the 20th century used a calculation called hip spring (or hip-spring or hipspring), calculated by subtracting the waist measurement from the hip measurement. However this calculation fell into disuse because it is a poor indicator of attractiveness; for example, a hip spring of 250 mm would likely be considered quite attractive for an average-sized adult woman, but a child or petite woman with the same number would more likely be seen as malnourished.

WHR versus BMI attractiveness is related to fertility, not fat content. A study performed by Holliday used computer generated female body shapes to construct images which covary with real female body mass (indexed with BMI) and not with body shape (indexed with WHR), and vice versa. Twelve observers (6 male and 6 female) rated these images for attractiveness during an fMRI study. The attractiveness ratings were correlated with changes in BMI and not WHR. The results demonstrated that in addition to activation in higher visual areas, changes to BMI had a direct impact on activity within the brain's reward system. This shows that BMI, not WHR, modulates reward mechanisms in the brain and that this may have important implications for judgements of ideal body size in eating-disordered individuals.

Another study, conducted by Adrian Furnham, was used as an extension of Singh and Young's 1995 investigation. A total of 137 participants were in the study. There were 98 female participants. The age range was between 16 and 67. The majority of participants were undergraduates, and 90% were white British, the remainder being Asian (East Indian) and African. Their educational and socio-economic backgrounds (nearly all middle class) were fairly homogenous, and none had previously participated in any studies involving female body shape or attractiveness. It was predicted that the effect of breast size on judgment of attractiveness and age estimation would be dependent on overall body fat and the size of the waist-to-hip ratio.

All the participants were given a booklet with eight pictures in total. Each figure was identified as heavy or slender, feminine WHR or masculine WHR, and large-breasted or small-breasted. The participants rated the figures for four personal attributes (attractiveness, healthiness, femininity, and kindness/understanding).

When ratings of the figures' attractiveness were made, generally it appeared that bust size, WHR, and their weight were all important contributory elements. The female participants rated the figures with a low WHR as more attractive, healthy, feminine-looking, and in the case of the heavy figure, more kind and understanding than did male participants. This is a particularly interesting finding, as most previous studies report that young women idealize female bodies solely on the basis of thinness. As far as the breast sizes of the slender figures is concerned, whether they had large or small breasts did not appear to have any effect on the ratings of attractiveness or kindness or understanding, and having larger breasts only increased the mean ratings of health and femininity very slightly. However, a heavy figure with a high WHR and a large bust was rated as the least attractive and healthy by all participants.

Waist–hip ratio is also a reliable cue to one's sex and it is hypothesised that the "individuals who represent a mismatch based on the cue provided by WHR (e.g., women with high WHR values or men with low WHR values) would likely be viewed as unattractive by the opposite sex."

A 2017 University of Wroclaw study of around one thousand women across different cultures—designed to address the conflicting theories—concluded that an attractive WHR is not a predictor of peak fertility, but actually a predictor of the onset of fertility and therefore a predictor of maximal long term reproductive potential and minimal chance of raising a competing male's children. The study authors concluded "Hence, it can be predicted that the preference for a low WHR results from male preference for women at peak residual reproductive value, just prior to first probably fertile ovulatory cycle (and with no previous children).

=== Male ===
Research has found waist-to-chest ratio to be the largest determinant of male attractiveness, with body mass index and waist-to-hip ratio not as significant.

== Food ==
A number of studies have been carried out with focus on food composition of diets in relation to changes in waist circumference adjusted for body mass index.

Whole-grain, ready-to-eat, oat cereal diets reduce low-density lipoprotein cholesterol and waist circumference in overweight or obese adults more than low-fibre control food diets. Weight loss did not vary between groups.

In an American sample of 459 healthy men and women participating in the ongoing 'Baltimore Longitudinal Study of Aging', the mean annual increase [with age] in waist circumference was more than 3 times as great for the participants in the white-bread cluster compared with the participants using a diet that is high in fruit, vegetables, reduced-fat dairy and whole grains and is low in red or processed meat, fast food and soft drink.

A 2011 study suggests that a dietary pattern high in fruit and dairy and low in white bread, processed meat, margarine, and soft drinks may help to prevent abdominal fat accumulation.

== See also ==
- Body proportions – Proportions of the human body in art
  - Artistic canons of body proportions – Criteria used in formal figurative art
- Digit ratio – Ratio of lengths of fingers
- Leg-to-body ratio – Numerical index of body proportion
- Physical attractiveness – Aesthetic assessment of physical traits
- Sexual attraction – Attraction on the basis of sexual desire
- Bust/waist/hip measurements – Measures used for fitting clothing
- Wasp waist – Women's fashion silhouette
- Waist-to-height ratio – Measure of the distribution of body fat (better indicator of health)
