= 1965 =

1965 in various calendars
- Gregorian calendar: 1965; MCMLXV
- Ab urbe condita: 2718
- Armenian calendar: 1414; ԹՎ ՌՆԺԴ
- Assyrian calendar: 6715
- Baháʼí calendar: 121–122
- Balinese saka calendar: 1886–1887
- Bengali calendar: 1371–1372
- Berber calendar: 2915
- British Regnal year: 13 Eliz. 2 – 14 Eliz. 2
- Buddhist calendar: 2509
- Burmese calendar: 1327
- Byzantine calendar: 7473–7474
- Chinese calendar: 甲辰年 (Wood Dragon); 4662 or 4455 — to — 乙巳年 (Wood Snake); 4663 or 4456
- Coptic calendar: 1681–1682
- Discordian calendar: 3131
- Ethiopian calendar: 1957–1958
- Hebrew calendar: 5725–5726
- Hindu calendars
- Vikram Samvat: 2021–2022
- Shaka Samvat: 1886–1887
- Kali Yuga: 5065–5066
- Holocene calendar: 11965
- Igbo calendar: 965–966
- Iranian calendar: 1343–1344
- Islamic calendar: 1384–1385
- Japanese calendar: Shōwa 40 (昭和４０年)
- Javanese calendar: 1896–1897
- Juche calendar: 54
- Julian calendar: Gregorian minus 13 days
- Korean calendar: 4298
- Minguo calendar: ROC 54 民國54年
- Nanakshahi calendar: 497
- Thai solar calendar: 2508
- Tibetan calendar: ཤིང་ཕོ་འབྲུག་ལོ་ (male Wood-Dragon); 2091 or 1710 or 938 — to — ཤིང་མོ་སྦྲུལ་ལོ་ (female Wood-Snake); 2092 or 1711 or 939

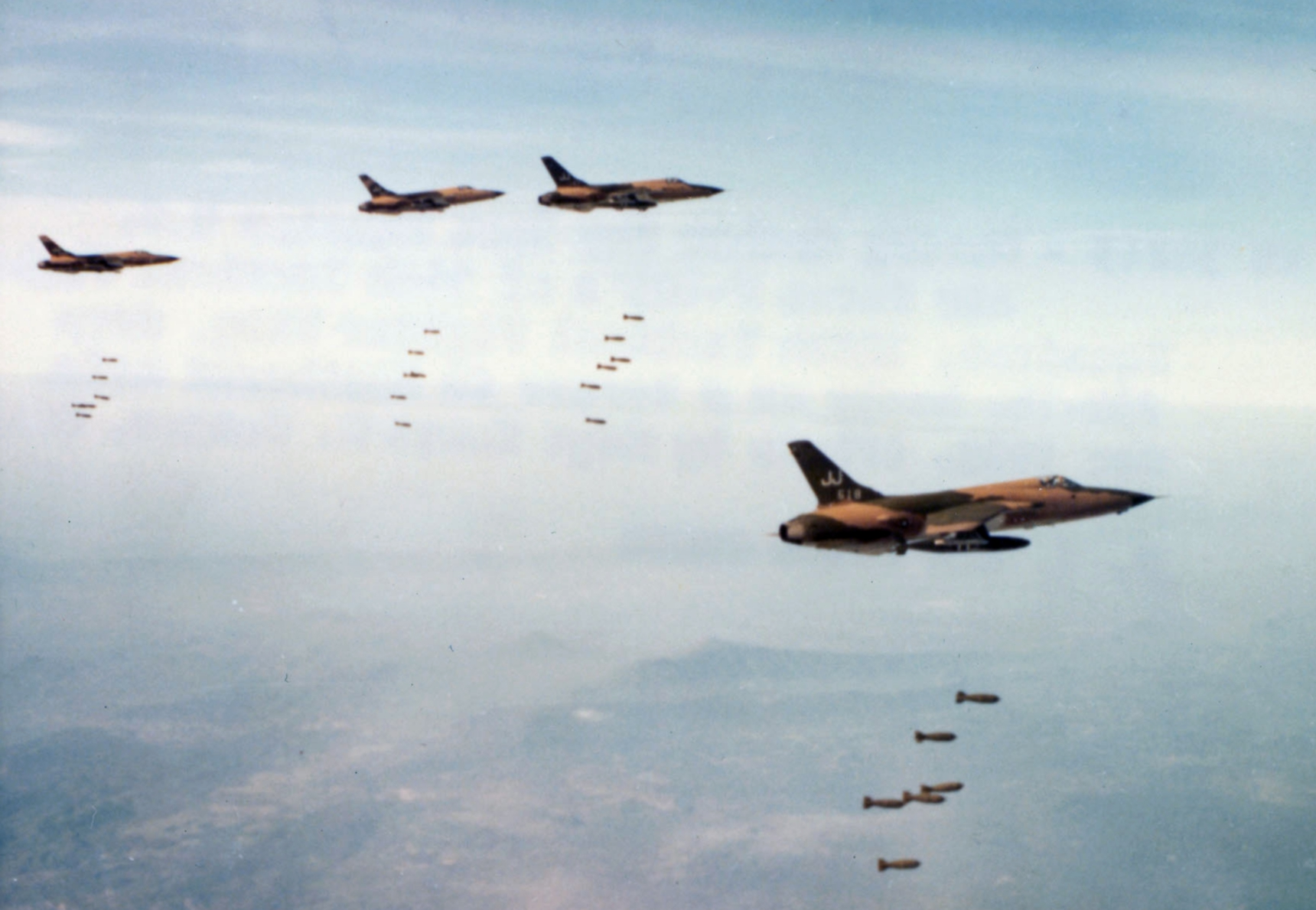
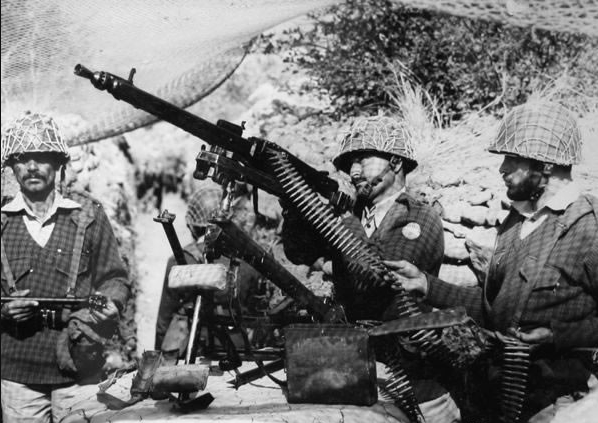
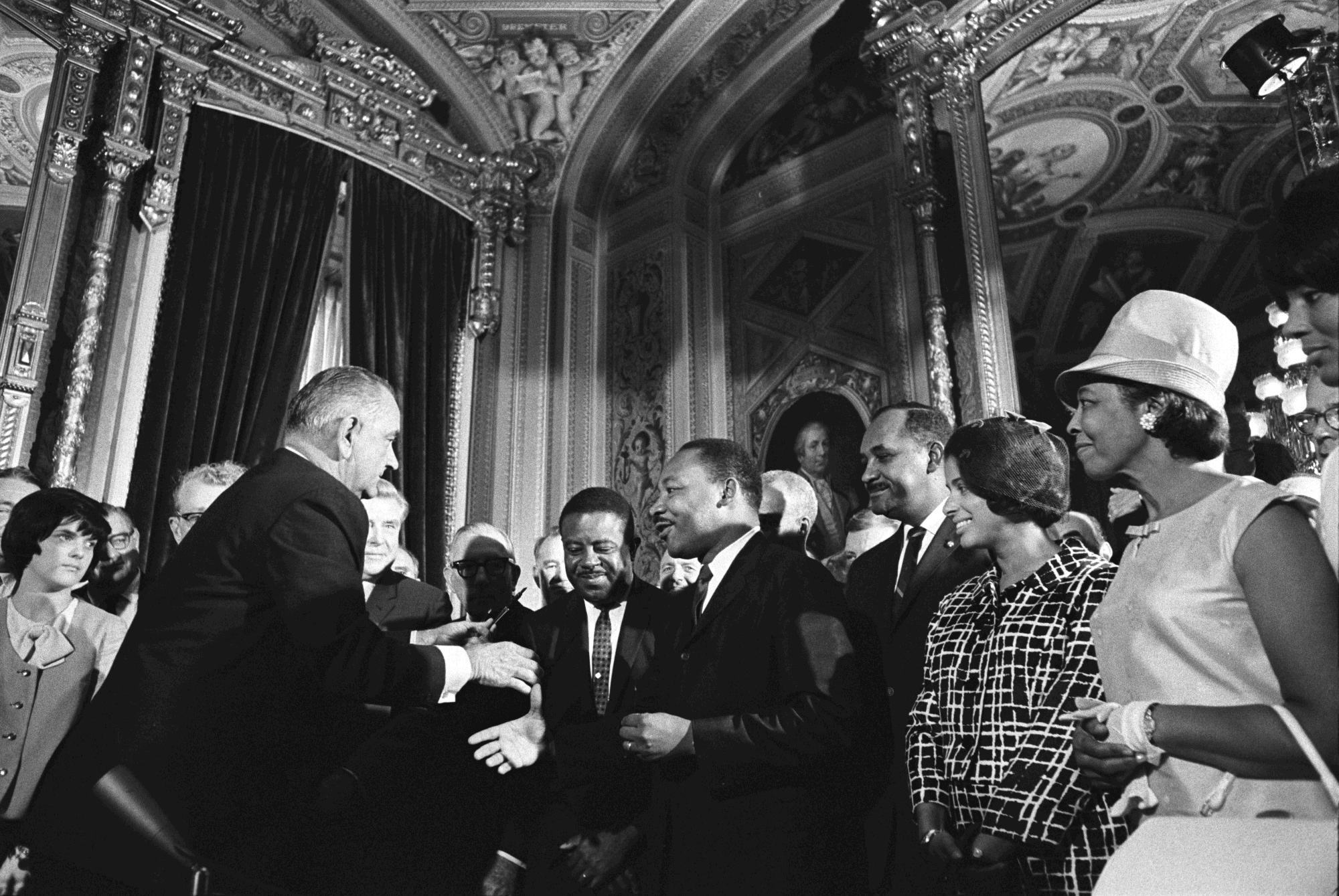
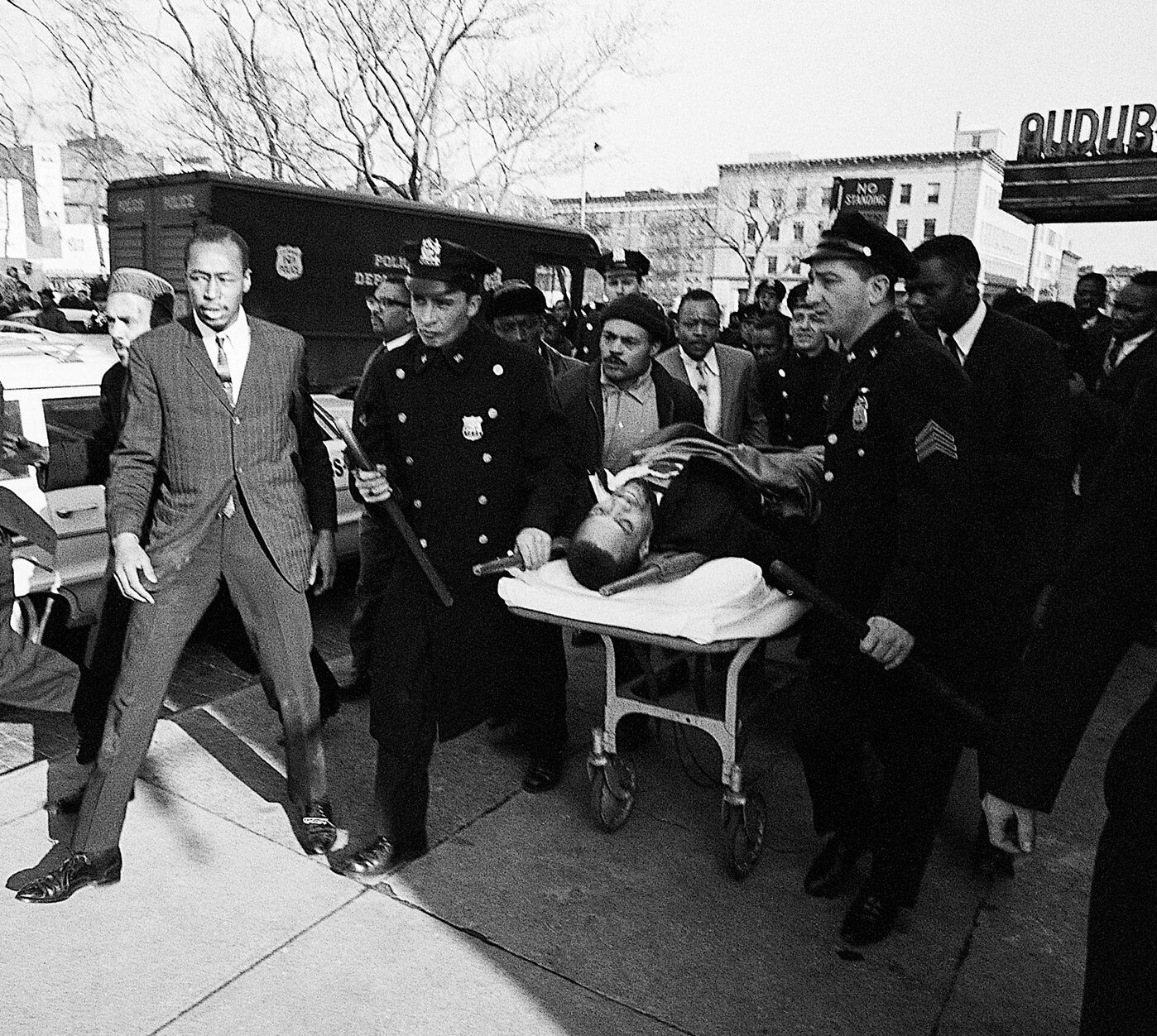
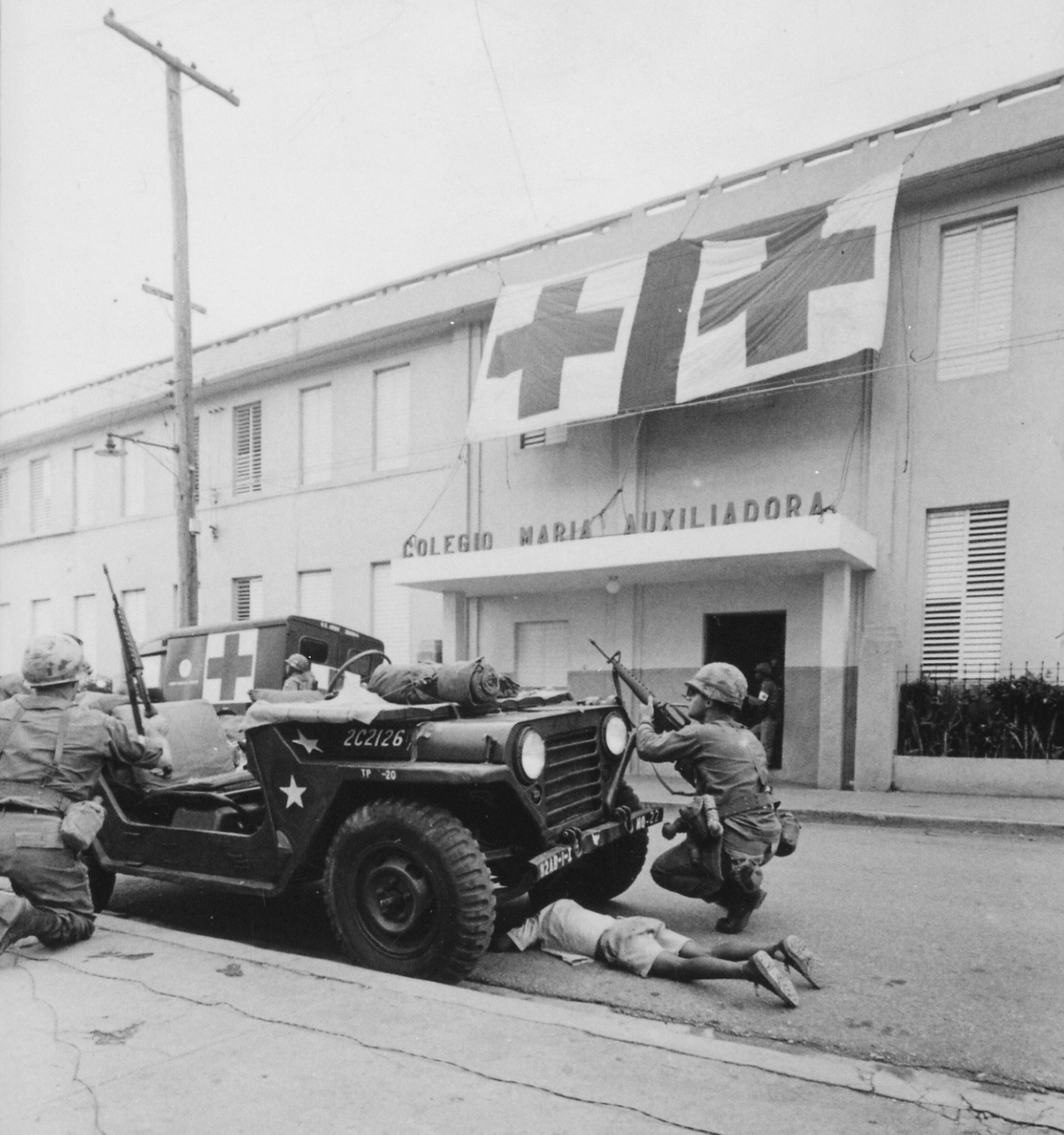
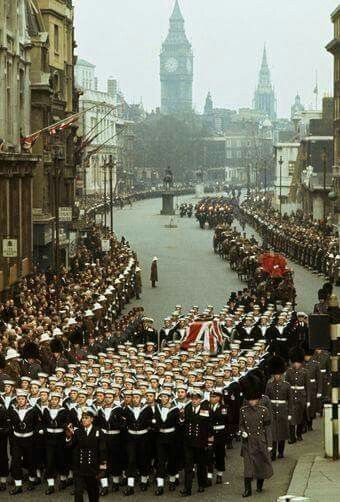
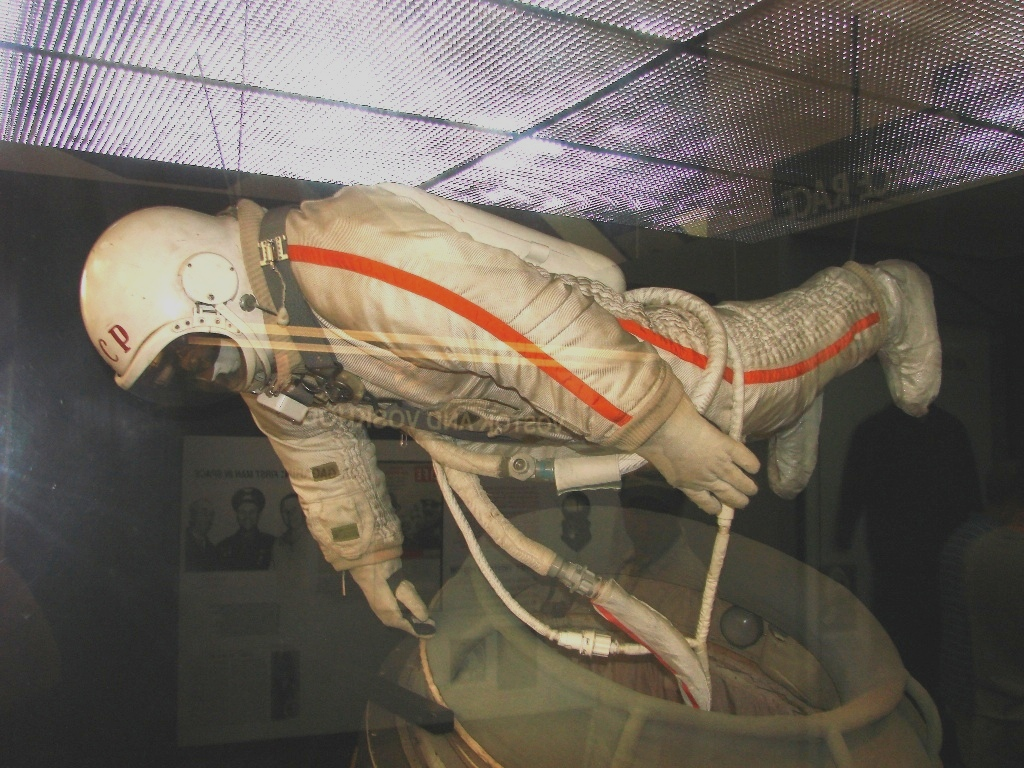
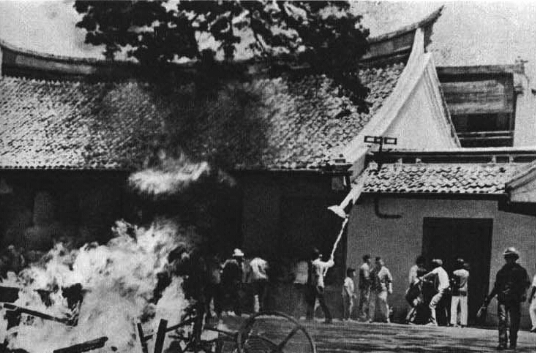
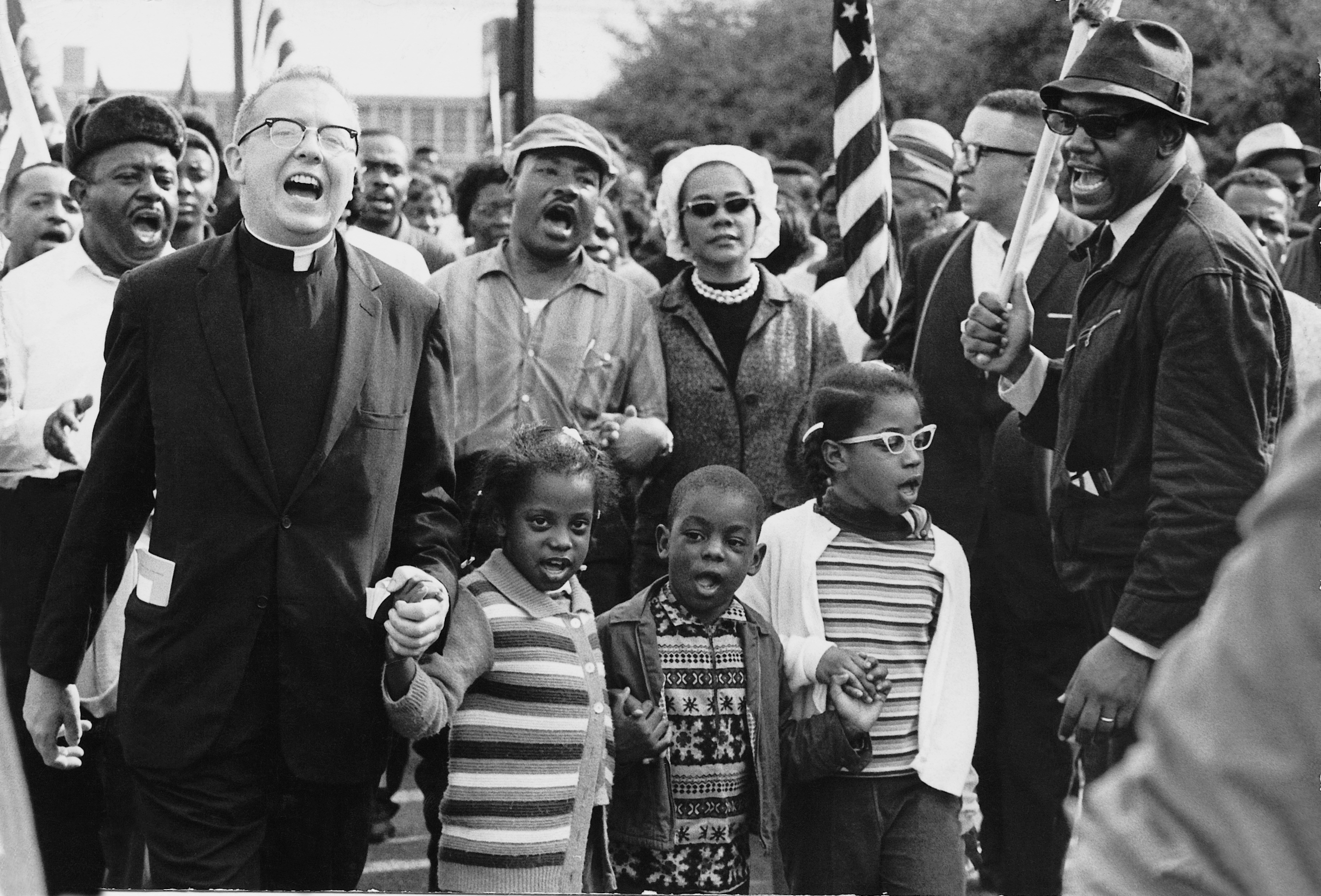
From top to bottom, left to right: the Vietnam War escalates as the United States begins Operation Rolling Thunder and sends ground troops; the Indo-Pakistani War of 1965 breaks out over Kashmir before a UN ceasefire; the Voting Rights Act of 1965 is signed, banning racial discrimination in voting; Malcolm X is assassinated in New York City; the Dominican Civil War prompts U.S. intervention; former British Prime Minister Winston Churchill dies at the age of ninety; cosmonaut Alexei Leonov makes the first spacewalk; the Indonesian mass killings of 1965–66 follow a failed coup, killing hundreds of thousands; and the Selma to Montgomery marches culminate in advancing federal voting protections.

1965 (MCMLXV) was a common year starting on Friday of the Gregorian calendar, the 1965th year of the Common Era (CE) and Anno Domini (AD) designations, the 965th year of the 2nd millennium, the 65th year of the 20th century, and the 6th year of the 1960s decade.

== Events ==
=== January–February ===
- January 14 – The First Minister of Northern Ireland and the Taoiseach of the Republic of Ireland meet for the first time in 43 years.
- January 20
  - Lyndon B. Johnson is sworn in for a full term as President of the United States.
  - Indonesian President Sukarno announces the withdrawal of the Indonesian government from the United Nations.
- January 29 – Hakametsä, the first ice rink of Finland, is inaugurated in Tampere.
- January 30 – The state funeral of Sir Winston Churchill takes place in London with the largest assembly of dignitaries in the world until the 2005 funeral of Pope John Paul II.
- February 4 – Trofim Lysenko is removed from his post as director of the Institute of Genetics at the Academy of Sciences in the Soviet Union. Lysenkoist theories are now treated as pseudoscience.
- February 12 – The African and Malagasy Common Organization (Organization Commune Africaine et Malgache; OCAM) is formed as successor to the Afro-Malagasy Union for Economic Cooperation (Union Africaine et Malgache de Cooperation Economique; UAMCE), formerly the African and Malagasy Union (Union Africaine et Malgache; UAM).

February 18: Flag of the newly independent Gambia

- February 15 – The maple leaf is adopted as the flag of Canada, replacing the Canadian Red Ensign flag.
- February 18 – The Gambia becomes independent from the United Kingdom.
- February 20
  - Ranger 8 crashes into the Moon, after a successful mission of photographing possible landing sites for the Apollo program astronauts.
  - Suat Hayri Ürgüplü forms the new (interim) government of Turkey (29th government).
- February 21 – Malcolm X is gunned down while giving a speech at the Audubon Ballroom in Harlem.

=== March–April ===
- March 2 – Vietnam War: Operation Rolling Thunder – The United States Air Force 2nd Air Division, United States Navy and South Vietnamese air force begin a 3 1/2-year aerial bombardment campaign against North Vietnam.
- March 7
  - Mass in the Catholic Church worldwide is said in local languages (rather than Latin) for the first time.
  - "Bloody Sunday": Some 200 Alabama State Troopers attack 525 civil rights demonstrators in Selma, Alabama, as they attempt to march to the state capitol of Montgomery.
- March 8 – Vietnam War: Some 3,500 United States Marines arrive in Da Nang, South Vietnam, becoming the first American ground combat troops in Vietnam.
- March 9 – The "Turnaround Tuesday" march from Selma to Montgomery, Alabama, under the leadership of Martin Luther King Jr., stops at the site of "Bloody Sunday", to hold a prayer service and return to Selma, in obedience to a court restraining order. On the same day, White supremacists attack three white ministers, leaving Unitarian Universalist minister James J. Reeb in a coma.
- March 10 – An engagement is announced between Princess Margriet of the Netherlands and Pieter van Vollenhoven, who will become the first commoner and the first Dutchman to marry into the Dutch royal family.
- March 18 – Cosmonaut Alexei Leonov leaves his Voskhod 2 spacecraft for 12 minutes, becoming the first person to walk in space.
- March 20
  - "Poupée de cire, poupée de son", sung by France Gall (music and lyrics by Serge Gainsbourg), wins the Eurovision Song Contest 1965 (staged in Naples) for Luxembourg.
  - The Indo-Pakistani War of 1965 begins.
- March 23
  - Events of March 23, 1965: Large student demonstration in Morocco, joined by discontented masses, meets with violent police and military repression.
  - Gemini 3: NASA launches the United States' first 2-person crew (Gus Grissom, John Young) into Earth orbit.
  - The first issue of The Vigilant is published from Khartoum.
- March 25 – Martin Luther King Jr. and 25,000 civil rights activists successfully end the 4-day march from Selma, Alabama, to the capitol in Montgomery.
- March 28 – At least 400 are killed or missing after an earthquake triggered a series of dam failures in La Ligua, Chile.
- March 30 – The second ODECA charter, signed by Central American states on December 12, 1962, becomes effective.
- April 3 – The world's first space nuclear power reactor, SNAP-10A, is launched by the United States from Vandenberg AFB, California. The reactor operates for 43 days and remains in low Earth orbit.
- April 5 – At the 37th Academy Awards, My Fair Lady wins 8 Academy Awards, including Best Picture and Best Director. Rex Harrison wins an Oscar for Best Actor. Mary Poppins takes home 5 Oscars. Julie Andrews wins an Academy Award for Best Actress for her performance in the title role. Sherman Brothers receives 2 Oscars including Best Song, "Chim Chim Cher-ee".
- April 6 – The Intelsat I ("Early Bird") communications satellite is launched. It becomes operational May 2 and is placed in commercial service in June.
- April 9 – The West German parliament extends the statute of limitations on Nazi war crimes.
- April 24
  - The 1965 Yerevan demonstrations start in Yerevan, demanding recognition of the Armenian genocide.
  - The bodies of Portuguese opposition politician Humberto Delgado and his secretary Arajaryr Moreira de Campos are found in a forest near Villanueva del Fresno, Spain (they were killed February 12).
  - In the Dominican Republic, officers and civilians loyal to deposed President Juan Bosch mutiny against the right-wing junta running the country, setting up a provisional government. Forces loyal to the deposed military-imposed government stage a countercoup the next day, and civil war breaks out, although the new government retains its hold on power.
- April 28
  - U.S. troops occupy the Dominican Republic.
  - Vietnam War: Prime Minister of Australia Robert Menzies announces that the country will substantially increase its number of troops in South Vietnam, supposedly at the request of the Saigon government (it is later revealed that Menzies had asked the leadership in Saigon to send the request at the behest of the Americans).
- April 29 – Australia announces that it is sending an infantry battalion to support the South Vietnam government.

=== May–June ===
- May 1
  - Bob Askin replaces Jack Renshaw as Premier of New South Wales.
  - The Battle of Dong-Yin occurs as a conflict between Taiwan and the People's Republic of China.
- May 9 – Pianist Vladimir Horowitz returns to the stage after a 12-year absence, performing a legendary concert in Carnegie Hall in New York.
- May 12 –West Germany and Israel establish diplomatic relations.
- May 27 – Internazionale beats Benfica 1–0 at the San Siro, Milan and wins the 1964–65 European Cup in Association football.
- May 28 – A mining accident in Dhanbad, India, kills 268.
- May 31 – Scottish racing driver Jim Clark wins the Indianapolis 500, later this year winning the Formula One world driving championship.
- June 1 – A coal mine explosion in Fukuoka, Japan, kills 237.
- June 2 – Vietnam War: The first contingent of Australian combat troops arrives in South Vietnam.
- June 3 – Launch of Gemini 4, a 4-day mission during which Ed White performs the first space walk by an American astronaut.
- June 7 – Kakanj mine disaster: A mining accident in Kakanj, Bosnia and Herzegovina, results in 128 deaths.
- June 10 – Vietnam War – Battle of Dong Xoai: About 1,500 Viet Cong mount a mortar attack on Đồng Xoài, overrunning its military headquarters and the adjoining militia compound.
- June 19
  - Houari Boumediene's Revolutionary Council ousts Ahmed Ben Bella, in a bloodless coup in Algeria.
  - Air Marshal Nguyen Cao Ky, head of the South Vietnamese Air Force, was appointed prime minister at the head of the military junta, with General Nguyễn Văn Thiệu becoming a figurehead president, ending two years of short-lived military juntas.
- June 20 – Police in Algiers break up demonstrations by people who have taken to the streets chanting slogans in support of deposed President Ahmed Ben Bella.
- June 22 – The Treaty on Basic Relations between Japan and the Republic of Korea is signed in Tokyo.
- June 25 – A U.S. Air Force Boeing C-135 Stratolifter bound for Okinawa crashes just after takeoff at MCAS El Toro in Orange County, California, killing all 85 on board.

=== July–August ===
- July – The Commonwealth secretariat is created.
- July 14 – U.S. spacecraft Mariner 4 flies by Mars, becoming the first spacecraft to return images from the Red Planet.
- July 15 – Greek Prime minister Georgios Papandreou and his government are dismissed by King Constantine II.
- July 16 – The Mont Blanc Tunnel, a highway tunnel between France and Italy, is inaugurated by presidents Charles de Gaulle and Giuseppe Saragat.
- July 24 – Vietnam War: Four F-4C Phantoms escorting a bombing raid at Kang Chi are targeted by antiaircraft missiles, in the first such attack against American planes in the war. One is shot down and the other 3 sustain damage.
- July 26 – The Maldives obtains full independence from Great Britain.
- July 27 – Edward Heath becomes Leader of the British Conservative Party.
- July 28 – Vietnam War: U.S. President Lyndon B. Johnson announces his order to increase the number of United States troops in South Vietnam from 75,000 to 125,000, and to more than double the number of men drafted per month - from 17,000 to 35,000.
- July 30 – War on Poverty: U.S. President Lyndon B. Johnson signs the Social Security Act of 1965 into law, establishing Medicare and Medicaid.
- August 6 – U.S. President Lyndon B. Johnson signs the Voting Rights Act into law, outlawing literacy tests and other discriminatory voting practices that have been responsible for widespread disfranchisement of African Americans.
- August 7 – Tunku Abdul Rahman, Prime Minister of Malaysia, recommends the expulsion of Singapore from the Federation of Malaysia following a deterioration of PAP–UMNO relations, negotiating its separation with Lee Kuan Yew, Prime Minister of Singapore.
- August 9
  - Proclamation of Singapore: Singapore is expelled from the Federation of Malaysia, which recognises it as a sovereign nation. Lee Kuan Yew announces Singapore's independence and assumes the position of Prime Minister of the new island nation – a position he holds until 1990.
  - An explosion at an Arkansas missile plant kills 53.
- August 11 – Racial rioting in the Los Angeles, California neighborhood of Watts breaks out after an African American motorist, Marquette Frye, is stopped on suspicion of drunken driving. Six days of unrest are quelled by over 14,000 members of the California National Guard. There are 34 deaths and over $40 million in property damage. It is the largest and costliest urban rebellion of the Civil Rights movement.
- August 14 – The Beatles performed their last appearance on The Ed Sullivan Show
- August 15 – The Beatles performed at Shea Stadium in New York City, making the first stadium concert in the US.
- August 18 – Vietnam War: Operation Starlite – 5,500 United States Marines destroy a Viet Cong stronghold on the Van Tuong peninsula in Quảng Ngãi Province, in the first major American ground battle of the war. The Marines were tipped off by a Viet Cong deserter who said that there was an attack planned against the U.S. base at Chu Lai.
- August 19 – At the conclusion of the Frankfurt Auschwitz trials, 66 ex-SS personnel receive life sentences, 15 others shorter ones.
- August 21 – NASA launches Gemini 5 (Gordon Cooper, Pete Conrad) on the first 1-week space flight, as well as the first test of fuel cells for electrical power on such a mission.
- August 30 – An avalanche buries a dam construction site at Saas-Fee, Switzerland, killing 90 workers.
- August 31 – U.S. President Johnson signs a law penalizing the burning of draft cards with up to 5 years in prison and a $1,000 fine.

=== September–October ===
- September 2
  - Pakistani troops enter the Indian sector of Kashmir, while Indian troops counter at Lahore.
  - The People's Republic of China announces that it will reinforce its troops on the Indian border.
  - Vietnam War: In a follow-up to August's Operation Starlite, United States Marines and South Vietnamese forces initiate Operation Piranha on the Batangan Peninsula, 23 miles (37 km) south of the Chu Lai Marine base.
- September 8 – Indo-Pakistani war:
  - India opens two additional fronts against Pakistan.
  - The Pakistan Navy destroys the Indian port of Dwarka. Operation Dwarka (Pakistan celebrates Victory Day annually).
- September 9
  - U.N. Secretary General U Thant negotiates with Pakistan President Ayub Khan.
  - U Thant recommends China for United Nations membership.
- September 14 – The fourth and final period of the Second Vatican Council opens.
- September 16 – In Iraq, Prime Minister Arif Abd ar-Razzaq's attempted coup fails.
- September 17 – King Constantine II of Greece forms a new government with Prime Minister Stephanos Stephanopoulos, in an attempt to end a 2-year-old political crisis.
- September 18
  - In Denmark, Palle Sørensen shoots 4 policemen in pursuit; he is apprehended the same day.
  - Comet Ikeya–Seki is first sighted by Japanese astronomers.
  - Soviet Premier Alexei Kosygin invites the leaders of India and Pakistan to meet in the Soviet Union to negotiate.
- September 19 – Pakistani Forces achieve a decisive victory at the Battle of Chawinda, ultimately halting the Indian advance and successfully stabilizing the Sialkot Front; it is the world's largest tank battle since the Battle of Kursk in the Second World War between Nazi Germany and the Soviet Union.
- September 20 – Vietnam War: An USAF F-104 Starfighter piloted by Captain Philip Eldon Smith is shot down by a Chinese MiG-19 Farmer. The pilot is held until March 15, 1973.
- September 21 – Gambia, Maldives and Singapore are admitted as members of the United Nations.
- September 22 – Radio Peking announces that Indian troops have dismantled their equipment on the Chinese side of the border.
- September 24
  - Fighting resumes between Indian and Pakistani troops.
  - The British governor of Aden cancels the constitution and takes direct control of the protectorate, due to the bad security situation.
- September 27 – The largest tanker ship at this time, Tokyo Maru, is launched in Yokohama, Japan.
- September 28
  - Fidel Castro announces that any Cuban who wants to can emigrate to the United States.
  - Taal Volcano in Luzon, Philippines, erupts, killing hundreds.
- September 30
  - The Indonesian army, led by General Suharto, crushes an alleged communist coup attempt (see Transition to the New Order and 30 September Movement).
  - The classic family sci-fi show Thunderbirds debuts on ITV in the United Kingdom.
- October 3 – Fidel Castro announces that Che Guevara has resigned and left Cuba.
- October 4
  - Durban rail accident: At least 150 are killed when a commuter train derails at the outskirts of Durban, KwaZulu-Natal, South Africa.
  - Prime minister Ian Smith of Rhodesia and Arthur Bottomley of the Commonwealth of Nations begin negotiations in London.
  - Pope Paul VI makes the first papal visit to the United States. He appears for a Mass in Yankee Stadium and makes a speech at the United Nations.
  - The University of California, Irvine opens its doors.
- October 5 – Pakistan severs diplomatic relations with Malaysia because of their disagreement in the UN.
- October 6 – Ian Brady, a 27-year-old stock clerk from Hyde in Cheshire, is arrested for allegedly hacking to death (with a hatchet) 17-year-old apprentice electrician Edward Evans at a house on the Hattersley housing estate. He and his girlfriend Myra Hindley are subsequently identified as the perpetrators of the "Moors murders" of four young people aged from 10 to 16.
- October 7 – Seven Japanese fishing boats are sunk off Guam by Super Typhoon Carmen; 209 are killed.
- October 8
  - Indonesian mass killings of 1965–1966: The Indonesian army instigates the arrest and execution of communists which last until next March.
  - The 7 Fundamental Principles of the Red Cross and Red Crescent are adopted at the XX International Conference in Vienna, Austria.
  - The International Olympic Committee admits East Germany as a member.
- October 10 – The first group of Cuban refugees travels to the U.S.
- October 12
  - Per Borten forms a government in Norway.
  - The U.N. General Council recommends that the United Kingdom try everything to stop a rebellion in Rhodesia.
- October 13 – Congo President Joseph Kasavubu fires Prime Minister Moise Tshombe and forms a provisional government, with Évariste Kimba in a leading position.
- October 15 – Vietnam War: The Catholic Worker Movement stages an anti-war protest in Manhattan. One draft card burner is arrested, the first under the new law.
- October 17 – The New York World's Fair at Flushing Meadows, closes. Due to financial losses, some of the projected site park improvements fail to materialize.
- October 18 – The Indonesian government outlaws the Communist Party of Indonesia.
- October 20 – Ludwig Erhard is re-elected Chancellor of West Germany (he had first been elected in 1963).
- October 21
  - Comet Ikeya–Seki approaches perihelion, passing 450,000 kilometres (280,000 mi) from the sun.
  - The Organization of African Unity meets in Accra, Ghana.
- October 22
  - African countries demand that the United Kingdom use force to prevent Rhodesia from declaring unilateral independence.
  - Colonel Christophe Soglo stages a second coup in Dahomey.
- October 25 – The Soviet Union declares its support of African countries in case Rhodesia unilaterally declares independence.
- October 27
  - Brazilian president Humberto de Alencar Castelo Branco removes power from parliament, legal courts and opposition parties.
  - Süleyman Demirel of AP forms the new government of Turkey (30th government).
- October 28 – Pope Paul VI promulgates Nostra aetate, a "Declaration on the Relation of the (Roman Catholic) Church with Non-Christian Religions" by the Second Vatican Council which includes a statement that Jews are not collectively responsible for the death of Jesus (Jewish deicide).
- October 29 – An 80-kiloton nuclear device is detonated at Amchitka Island, Alaska, as part of the Vela Uniform program, code-named Project Long Shot.
- October 30
  - Vietnam War: Near Da Nang, United States Marines repel an intense attack by Viet Cong forces, killing 56 guerrillas. A sketch of Marine positions is found on the dead body of a 13-year-old Vietnamese boy who sold drinks to the Marines the day before.
  - English model Jean Shrimpton wears an above-the-knee white shift dress in Orlon to the Victoria Derby at Flemington Racecourse in Melbourne, Australia, causing a global sensation in women's fashion.

=== November–December ===
- November 1 – A trolleybus plunges into the Nile at Cairo, Egypt, killing 74 passengers.
- November 3 – French President Charles de Gaulle announces (just short of his 75th birthday) that he will stand for re-election.
- November 5 – Martial law is announced in Rhodesia. The United Nations General Assembly accepts British intent to use force against Rhodesia if necessary by a vote of 82–9.
- November 6 – Freedom Flights begin: Cuba and the United States formally agree to start an airlift for Cubans who want to go to the United States (by 1971, 250,000 Cubans take advantage of this program).
- November 8 – Vietnam War – Operation Hump: The United States Army 173rd Airborne is ambushed by over 1,200 Viet Cong.
- November 11
  - In Rhodesia (modern-day Zimbabwe), the white-minority government of Ian Smith unilaterally declares de facto independence ('UDI').
  - United Airlines Flight 227 crashes short of the runway and catches fire at Salt Lake City International Airport, killing 43 out of 91 passengers and crew.
- November 12 – A UN Security Council resolution (voted 10–0) recommends that other countries not recognize independent Rhodesia.
- November 13
  - The SS Yarmouth Castle burns and sinks 60 miles (97 km) off Nassau, Bahamas, with the loss of 90 lives.
  - British theatre critic Kenneth Tynan says "fuck" during a discussion on BBC satirical programme BBC-3 for what many believed was the first time on British television. The corporation later issues a public apology.
- November 14 – Vietnam War – Battle of Ia Drang: In the Ia Drang Valley of the Central Highlands in Vietnam, the first major engagement of the war between regular United States and North Vietnamese forces begins.
- November 15 – U.S. racer Craig Breedlove sets a new land speed record of 600.601 mph (966.574 km/h).
- November 16 – Venera program: The Soviet Union launches the Venera 3 space probe from Baikonur, Kazakhstan toward Venus (on March 1, 1966, it becomes the first spacecraft to reach the surface of another planet).
- November 20 – The United Nations Security Council recommends that all states stop trading with Rhodesia.
- November 22 – The United Nations Development Programme (UNDP) is established as a specialized agency of the United Nations.
- November 23 – Soviet general Mikhail Kazakov assumes command of the Warsaw Pact.
- November 24 – Congolese lieutenant general Mobutu ousts Joseph Kasavubu and declares himself president.
- November 26 – At the Hammaguir launch facility in the Sahara Desert, France launches a Diamant A rocket with its first satellite, Astérix-1 on board, becoming the third country to enter outer space.
- November 27
  - Tens of thousands of Vietnam War protesters picket the White House, then march on the Washington Monument.
  - Vietnam War: The Pentagon tells U.S. President Lyndon B. Johnson that if planned major sweep operations to neutralize Viet Cong forces during the next year are to succeed, the number of American troops in Vietnam will have to be increased from 120,000 to 400,000.
- November 28 – Vietnam War: In response to U.S. President Lyndon B. Johnson's call for "more flags" in Vietnam, Philippines President-elect Ferdinand Marcos announces he will send troops to help fight in South Vietnam.
- November 29 – The Canadian satellite Alouette 2 is launched.
- December 5
  - Charles de Gaulle is re-elected as French president with 10,828,421 votes.
  - The "Glasnost Meeting" in Moscow becomes the first spontaneous political demonstration, and the first demonstration for civil rights in the Soviet Union.

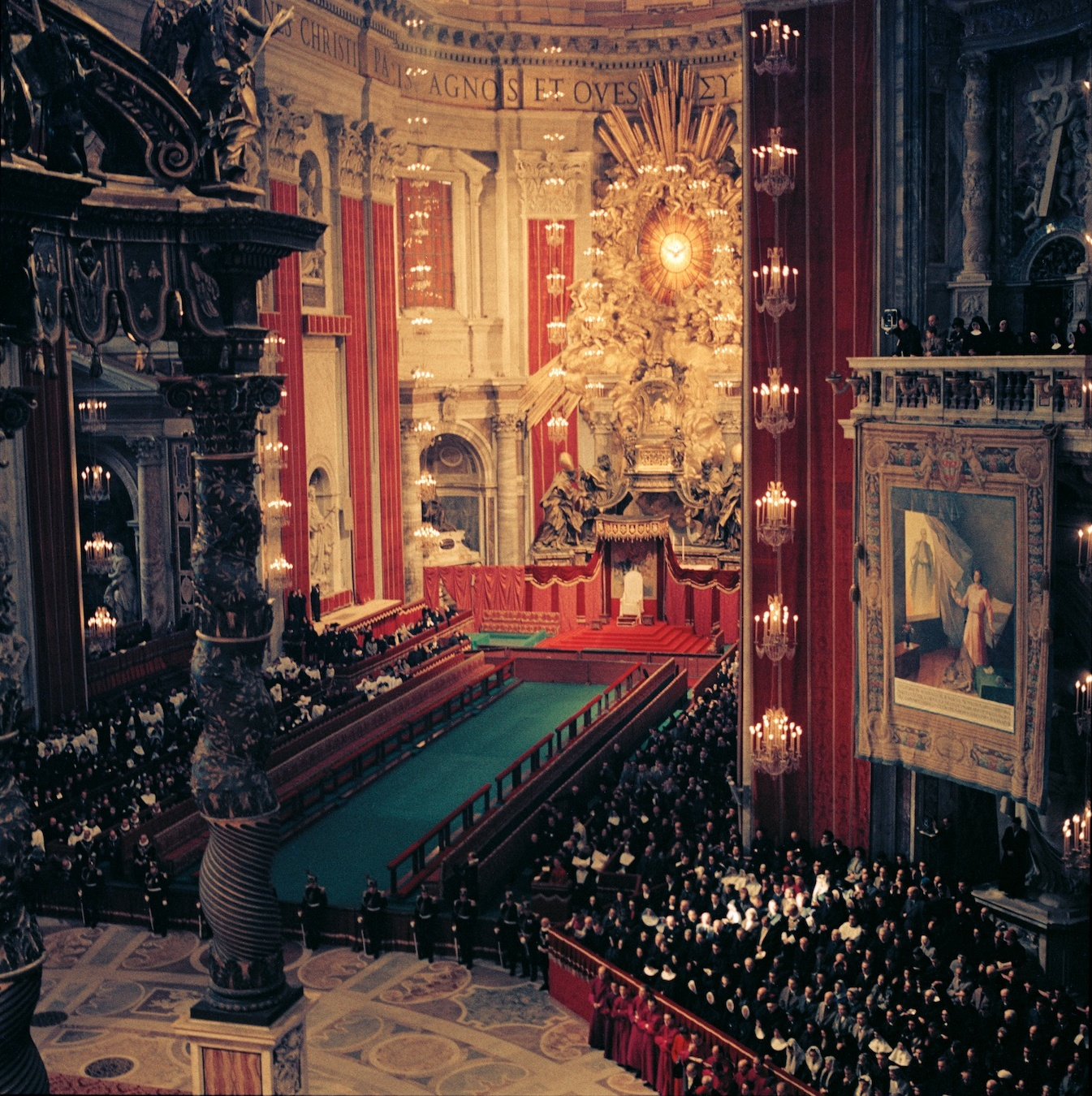
December 8: End of the Second Vatican Council

- December 8
  - The Second Vatican Council closes.
  - Rhodesian prime minister Ian Smith warns that Rhodesia will resist a trade embargo by neighboring countries with force.
  - The Race Relations Act becomes the first legislation to address racial discrimination in the UK.
- December 9 – A Charlie Brown Christmas, the first Peanuts television special, debuts on CBS in the United States. It becomes a Christmas tradition.
- December 15
  - The Caribbean Free Trade Association (CARIFTA) is formed.
  - Gemini 6 and Gemini 7 perform the first controlled rendezvous in Earth orbit.
- December 17 – The Queensland Elections Act Amendment Bill 1965 passes. Indigenous voting provisions in this Act would be enacted on 1 February 1966, giving Aboriginal people the vote in Queensland, Australia.
- December 20 – The World Food Programme is made a permanent agency of the United Nations.
- December 21
  - The Soviet Union announces that it has shipped rockets to North Vietnam.
  - In West Germany, Konrad Adenauer resigns as chairman of the Christian Democratic Party.
  - The United Nations adopts the International Convention on the Elimination of All Forms of Racial Discrimination.
  - A new 1-hour German-American production of the ballet The Nutcracker, with an international cast that includes Edward Villella in the title role, makes its U.S. television debut. It is repeated annually by CBS over the next 3 years but after that is virtually forgotten until issued on DVD in 2009 by Warner Archive.
- December 22 – A military coup is launched in Dahomey.
- December 25 – The Yemeni Nasserist Unionist People's Organisation is founded in Taiz.

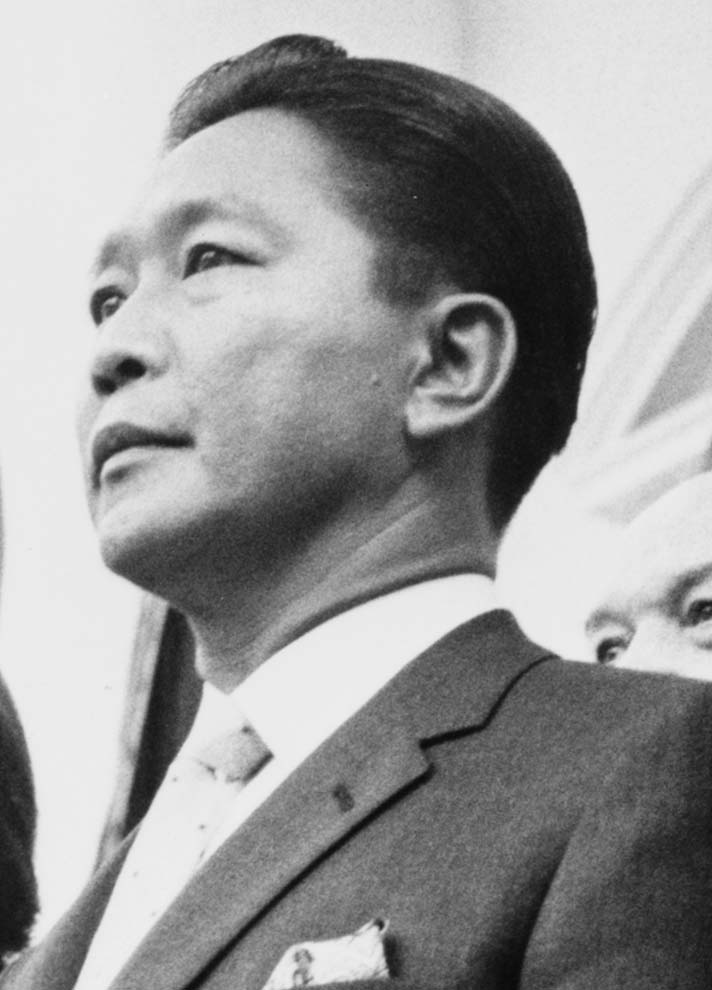
December 30: Ferdinand Marcos is the 10th President of the Philippines

- December 30
  - Ferdinand Marcos becomes President of the Philippines.
  - President Kenneth Kaunda of Zambia announces that Zambia and the United Kingdom have agreed on a deadline before which the Rhodesian white government should be ousted.
- December 31 – Bokassa takes power in the Central African Republic.

=== Date unknown ===
- Hainzl Industriesysteme GmbH company is founded in Austria.
- Tokyo officially becomes the largest city of the world, taking the lead from New York City.

=== World population ===
World population
	1965	1960		1970	
World	3,334,874,000	3,021,475,000	313,399,000	3,692,492,000	357,618,000
Africa	313,744,000	277,398,000	36,346,000	357,283,000	43,539,000
Asia	1,899,424,000	1,701,336,000	198,088,000	2,143,118,000	243,694,000
Europe	634,026,000	604,401,000	29,625,000	655,855,000	21,829,000
Latin America	250,452,000	218,300,000	32,152,000	284,856,000	34,404,000
Northern America	219,570,000	204,152,000	15,418,000	231,937,000	12,367,000
Oceania	17,657,000	15,888,000	1,769,000	19,443,000	1,786,000

== Births ==
=== January ===
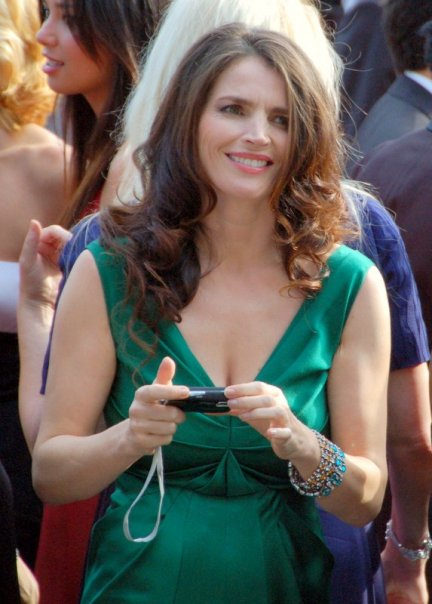
Julia Ormond

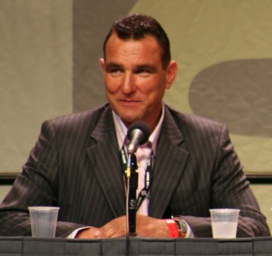
Vinnie Jones

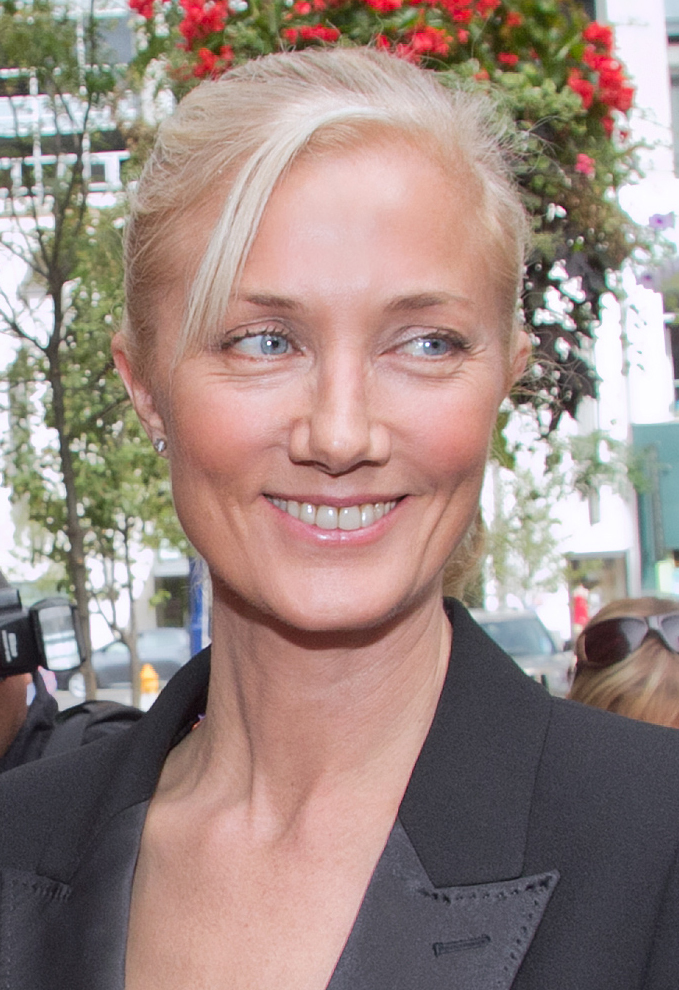
Joely Richardson

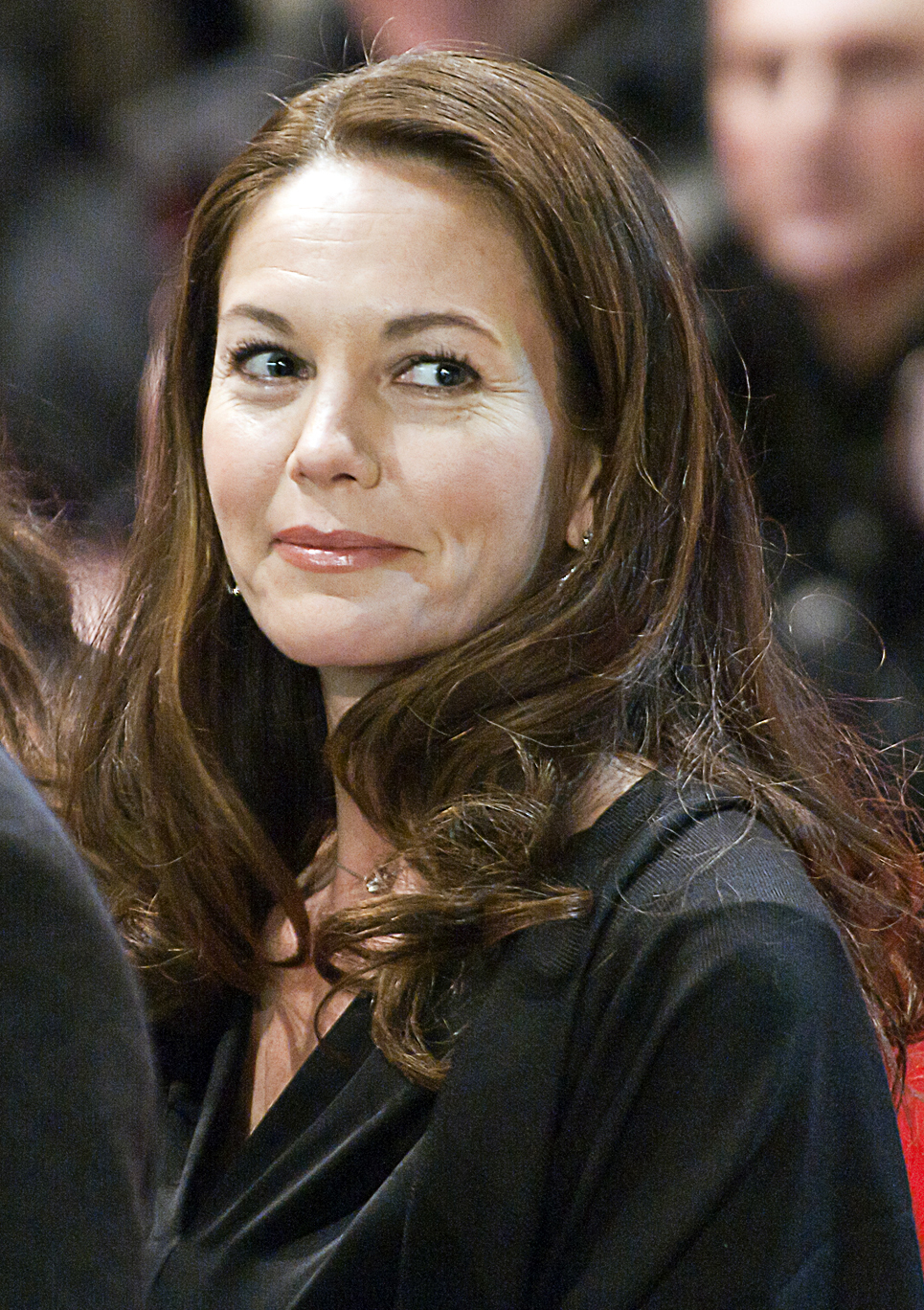
Diane Lane

- January 4
  - Julia Ormond, British actress
  - Yvan Attal, Israeli-born French actor and director
- January 5
  - Vinnie Jones, British footballer-turned-actor
  - Patrik Sjöberg, Swedish high jumper
- January 9
  - Haddaway, German singer
  - Farah Khan, Indian choreographer, film director
  - Joely Richardson, British actress
- January 10 – Butch Hartman, American animator and voice actor
- January 12
  - Nikolai Borschevsky, Russian ice hockey player
  - Maybrit Illner, German television journalist and presenter
  - Rob Zombie, American musician
- January 14
  - Shamil Basayev, Chechen terrorist (d. 2006)
  - Marc Delissen, Dutch field hockey player

fisa* January 15

  - Adam Jones, American musician, guitarist of metal band Tool
  - James Nesbitt, Northern Irish actor
- January 19 – JB Pritzker, American politician and businessman, 43rd Governor of Illinois
- January 20 – Sophie, Duchess of Edinburgh, wife of Prince Edward, Duke of Edinburgh
- January 21 – Jam Master Jay, American DJ, rapper and producer (d. 2002)
- January 22
  - DJ Jazzy Jeff, American disc jockey
  - Diane Lane, American actress
- January 23 – Catherine Guillouard, French businesswoman
- January 25 – Esa Tikkanen, Finnish ice hockey player
- January 26 – Natalia Yurchenko, Soviet artistic gymnast
- January 27
  - Alan Cumming, Scottish actor
  - Ignacio Noé, Argentine artist
- January 29
  - Dominik Hašek, Czech hockey player
  - Jo Min-su, South Korean actress

=== February ===
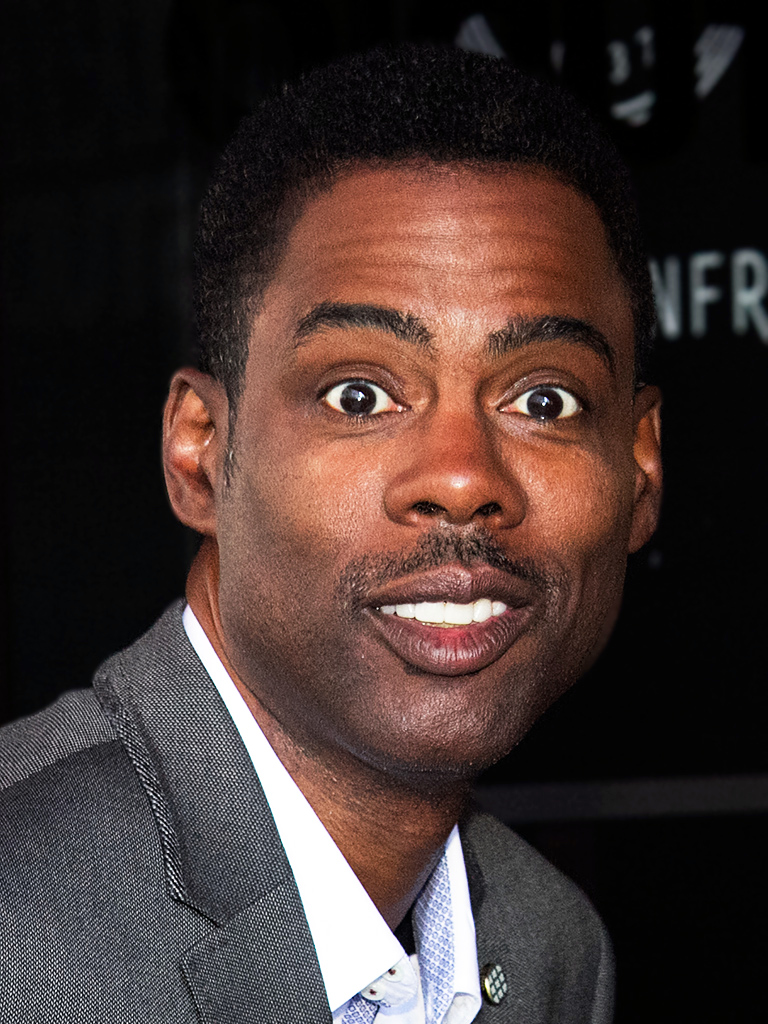
Chris Rock

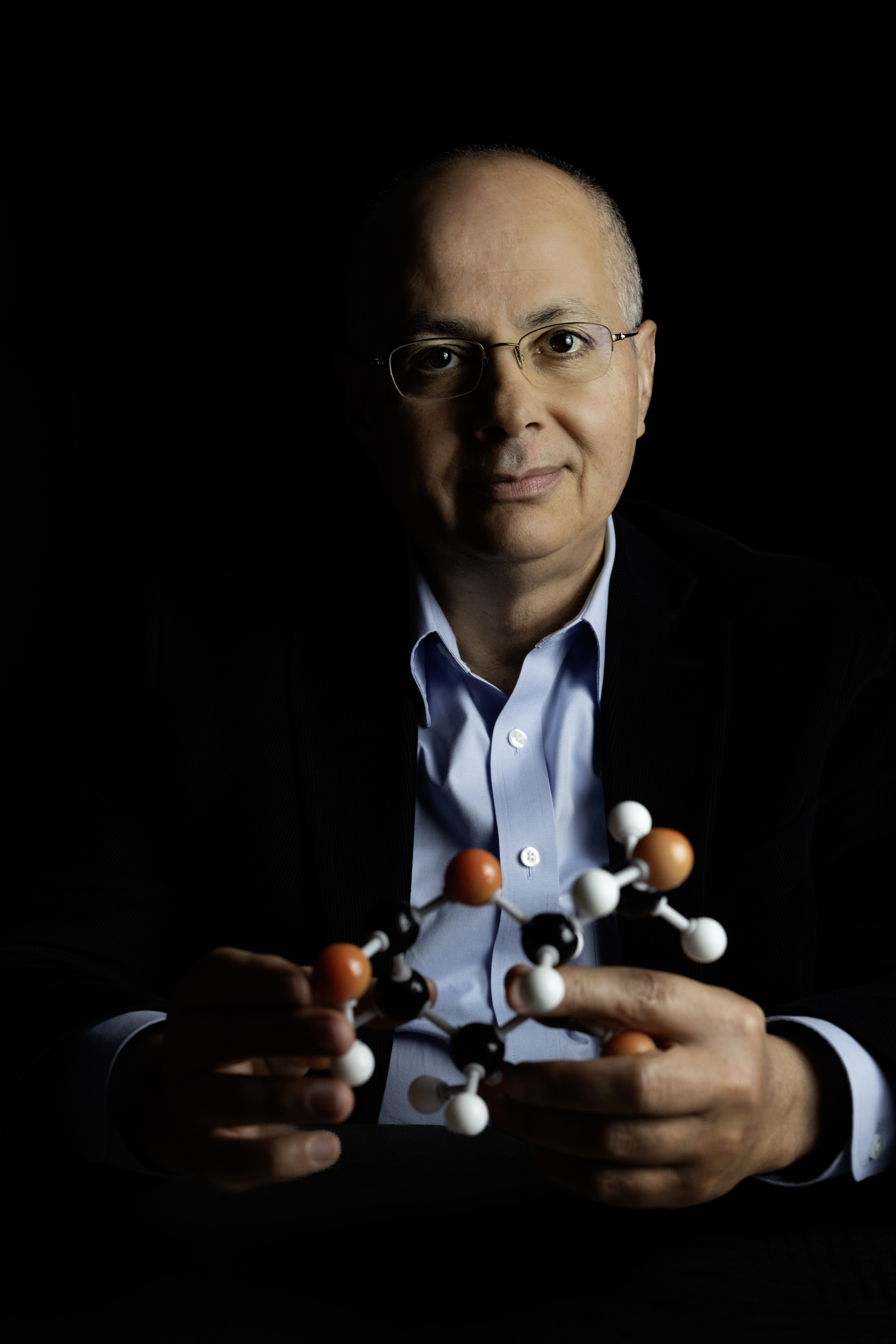
Omar Yaghi

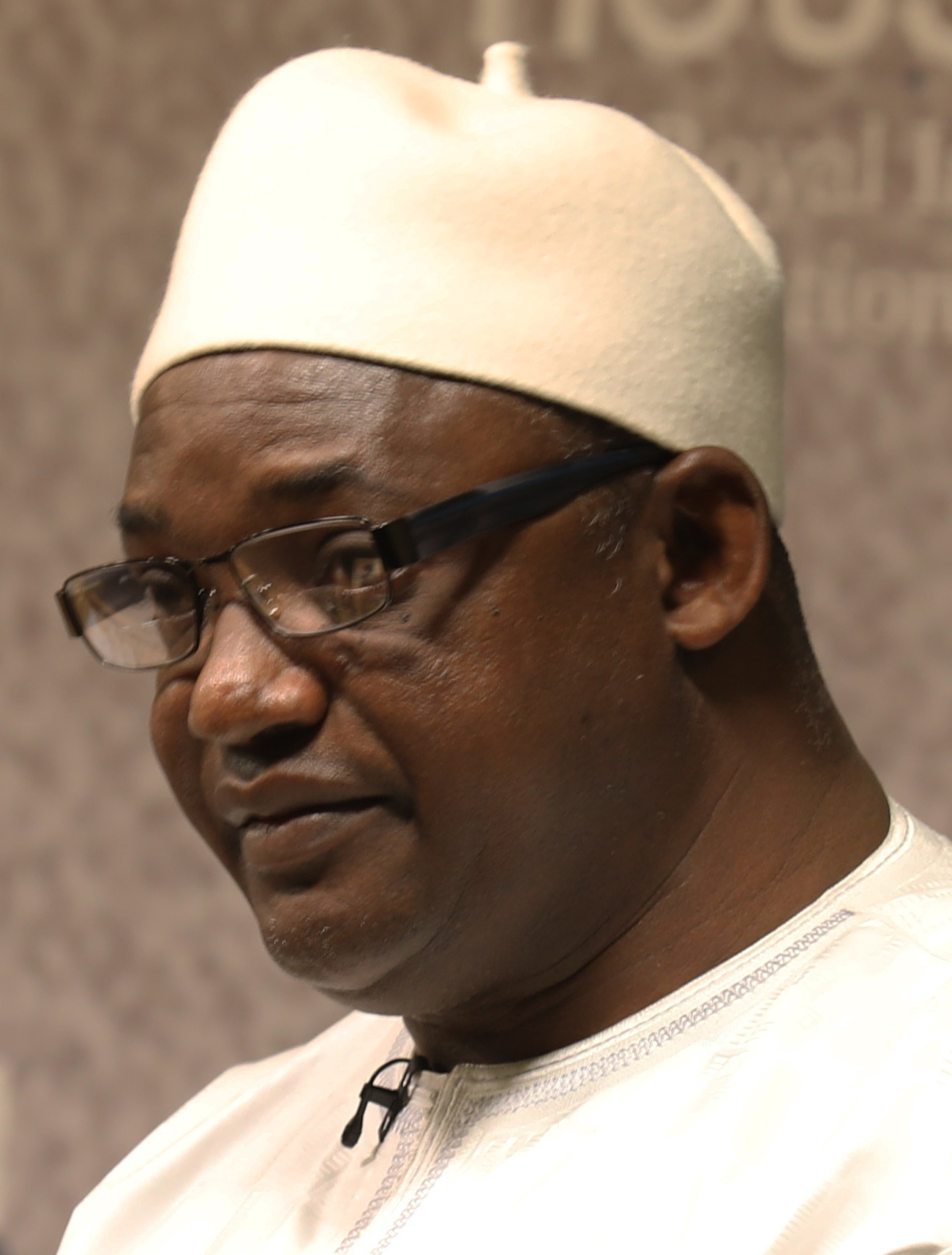
Adama Barrow

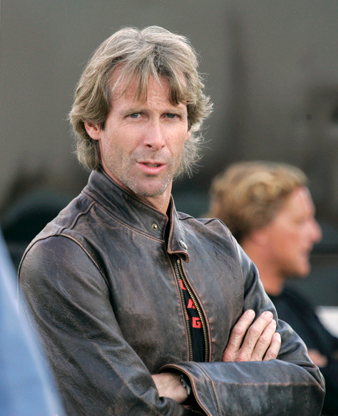
Michael Bay

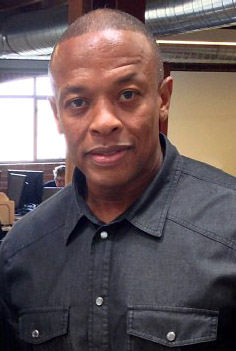
Dr. Dre

- February 1
  - Dave Callaghan, South African cricketer
  - Brandon Lee, Chinese-American actor (d. 1993)
  - Sherilyn Fenn, American actress
  - Princess Stéphanie of Monaco
- February 3 – Maura Tierney, American actress
- February 5 – Gheorghe Hagi, Romanian footballer, manager and club owner
- February 7 – Chris Rock, African-American actor, comedian, and film director
- February 8 – Dicky Cheung, Hong Kong actor
- February 9 – Omar Yaghi, Palestinian-Jordanian-American chemist
- February 11 – Roberto Moya, Cuban athlete (d. 2020)
- February 12 – Brett Kavanaugh, American attorney and Supreme Court Justice
- February 15 – Héctor Beltrán Leyva, Mexican drug lord (d. 2018)
- February 16 – Adama Barrow, Gambian politician, 3rd President of Gambia
- February 17 – Michael Bay, American film director
- February 18 – Dr. Dre, African-American rapper and music producer
- February 23
  - Kristin Davis, American actress
  - Michael Dell, American computer manufacturer
  - Vincent Chalvon-Demersay, French producer
  - Helena Suková, Czech tennis player
- February 25 – Sylvie Guillem, French ballerina
- February 27 – Claudia Zobel, Filipina actress (d. 1984)
- February 28 – Park Gok-ji, South Korean film editor

=== March ===
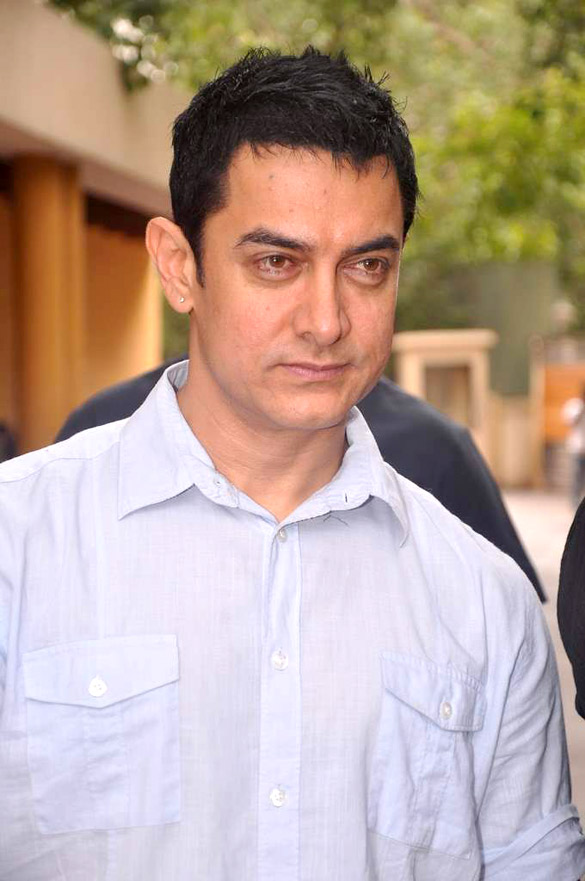
Aamir Khan

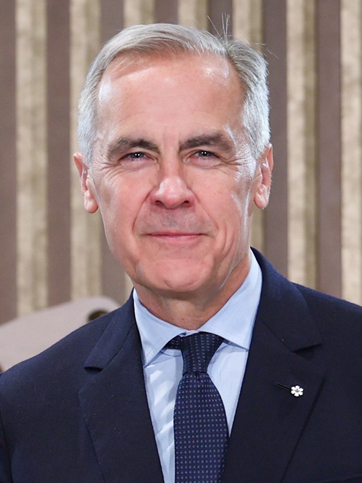
Mark Carney

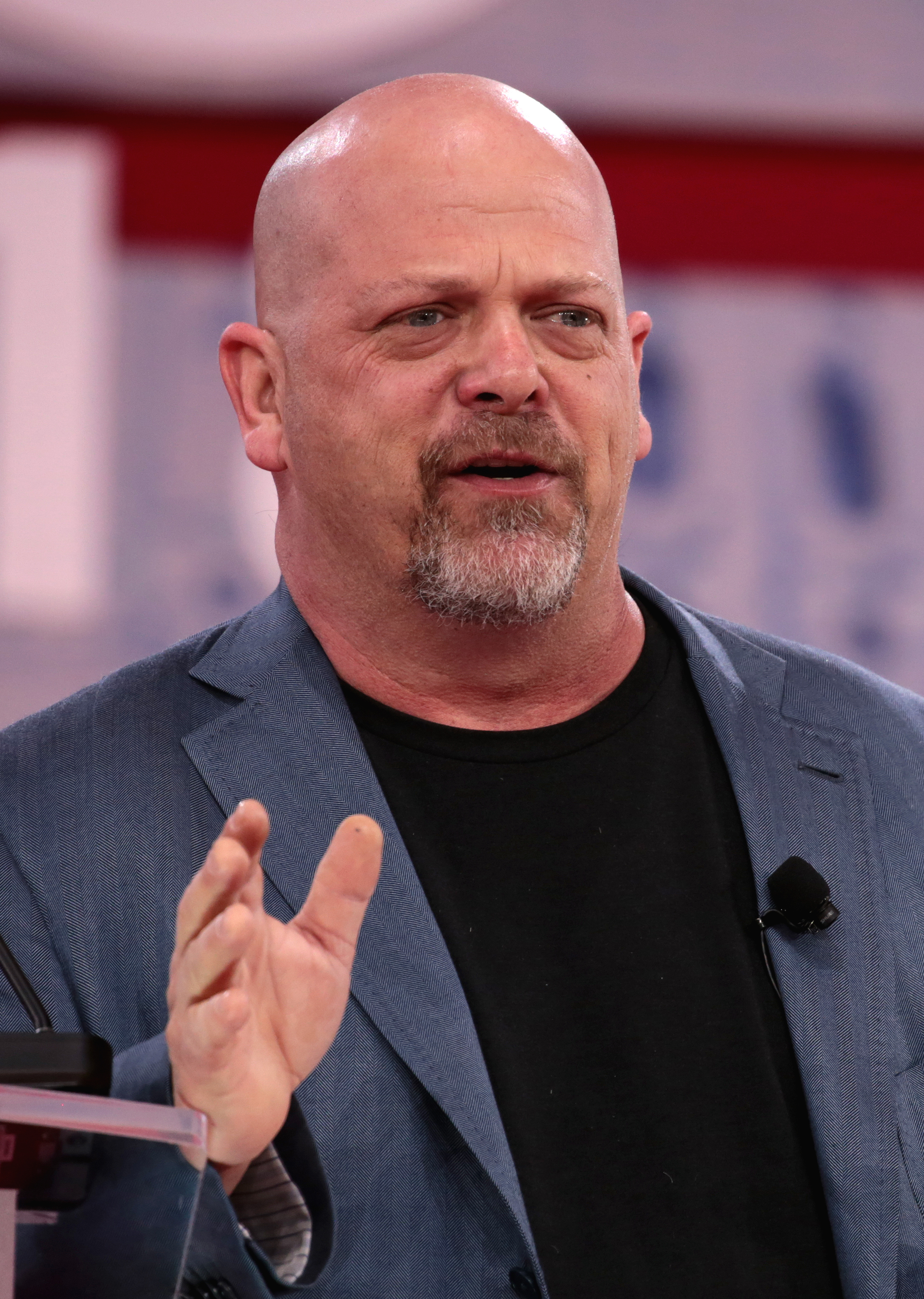
Rick Harrison

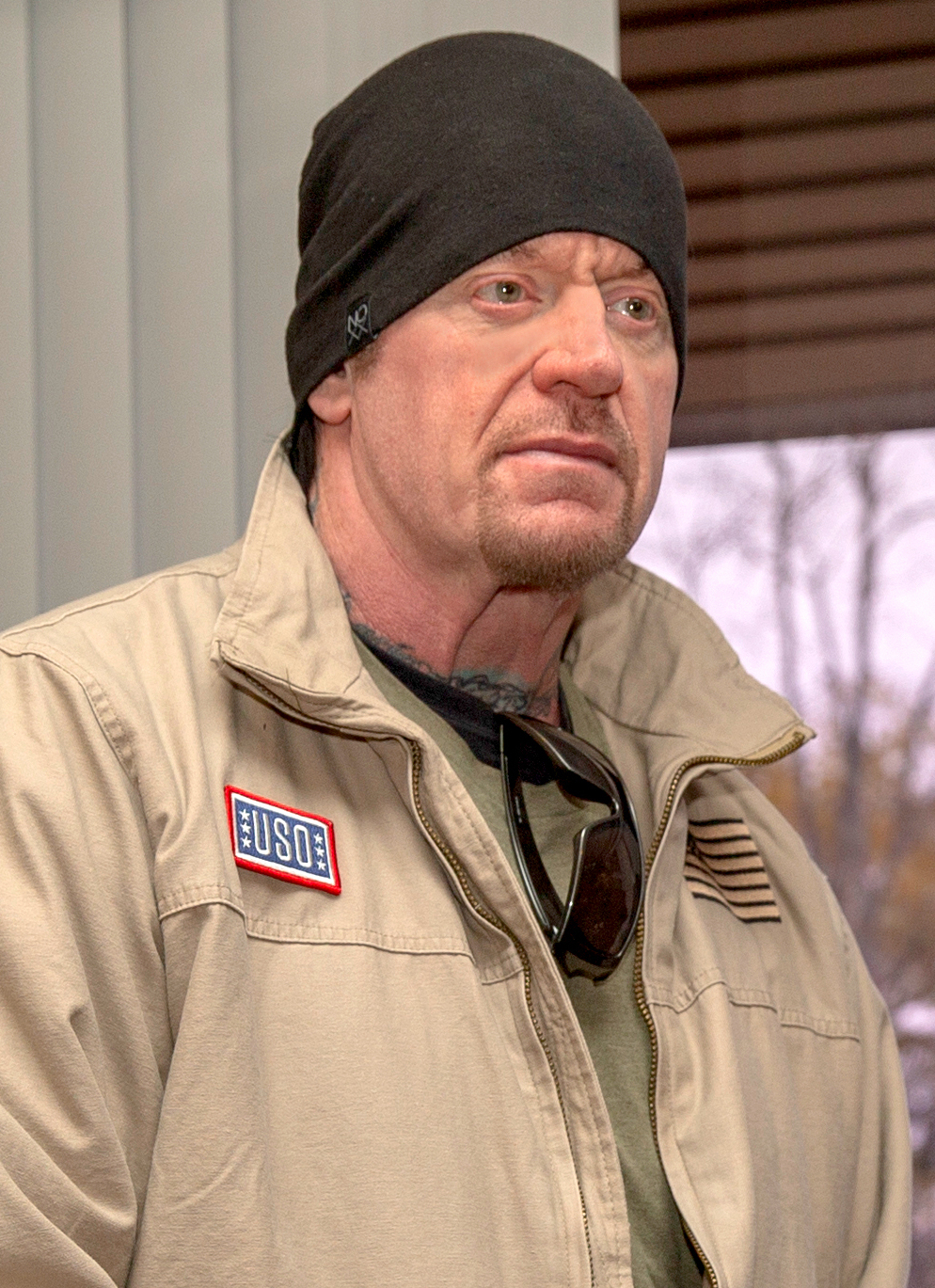
The Undertaker

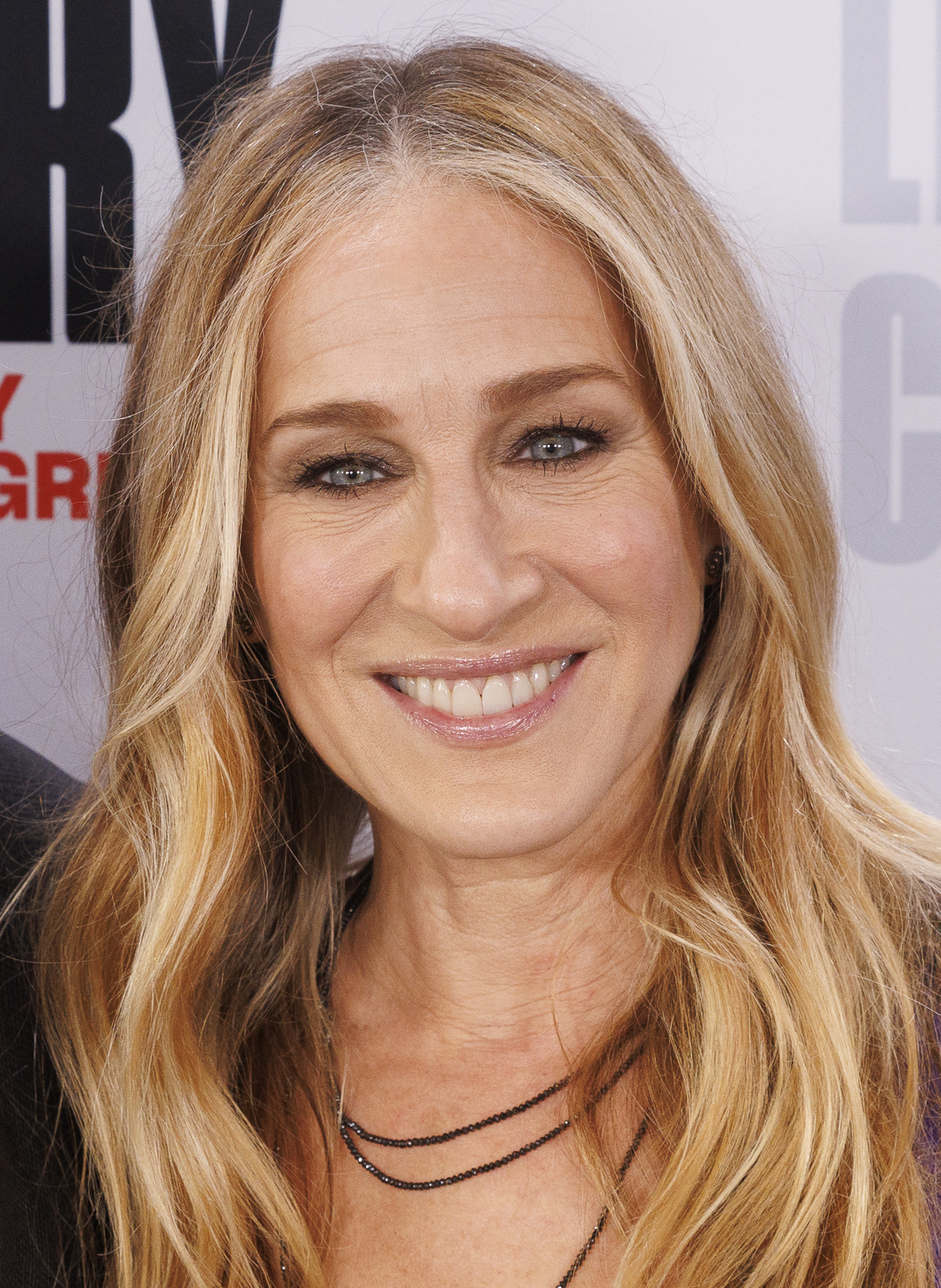
Sarah Jessica Parker

- March 1
  - Mike Dean, Record producer
  - Stewart Elliott, Canadian jockey
  - Jack Tu, Taiwanese-Canadian cardiologist (d. 2018)
- March 2 – Ami Bera, American politician
- March 3 – Tedros Adhanom, Director of the World Health Organization
- March 4 – Paul W. S. Anderson, British filmmaker, producer and screenwriter
- March 8 – Caio Júnior, Brazilian football forward and manager (d. 2016)
- March 9 – Antonio Saca, 43rd President of El Salvador
- March 11
  - Catherine Fulop, Venezuelan actress, model, beauty pageant contestant, and television presenter
  - Jesse Jackson Jr., African-American politician
- March 14 – Aamir Khan, Indian film director, producer, film and scriptwriter and actor
- March 16
  - Utut Adianto, Indonesian chess grandmaster and politician
  - Mark Carney, Canadian economist and politician, 24th Prime Minister of Canada
- March 23 – Marti Pellow, Scottish singer (Wet Wet Wet)
- March 24 – The Undertaker, American professional wrestler
- March 25
  - Stefka Kostadinova, Bulgarian high jumper and president of the Bulgarian Olympic Committee
  - Sarah Jessica Parker, American actress
- March 26 – Prakash Raj, Indian actor, producer and director
- March 29 – Voula Patoulidou, Greek athlete
- March 30 – Piers Morgan, British journalist and television personality

=== April ===
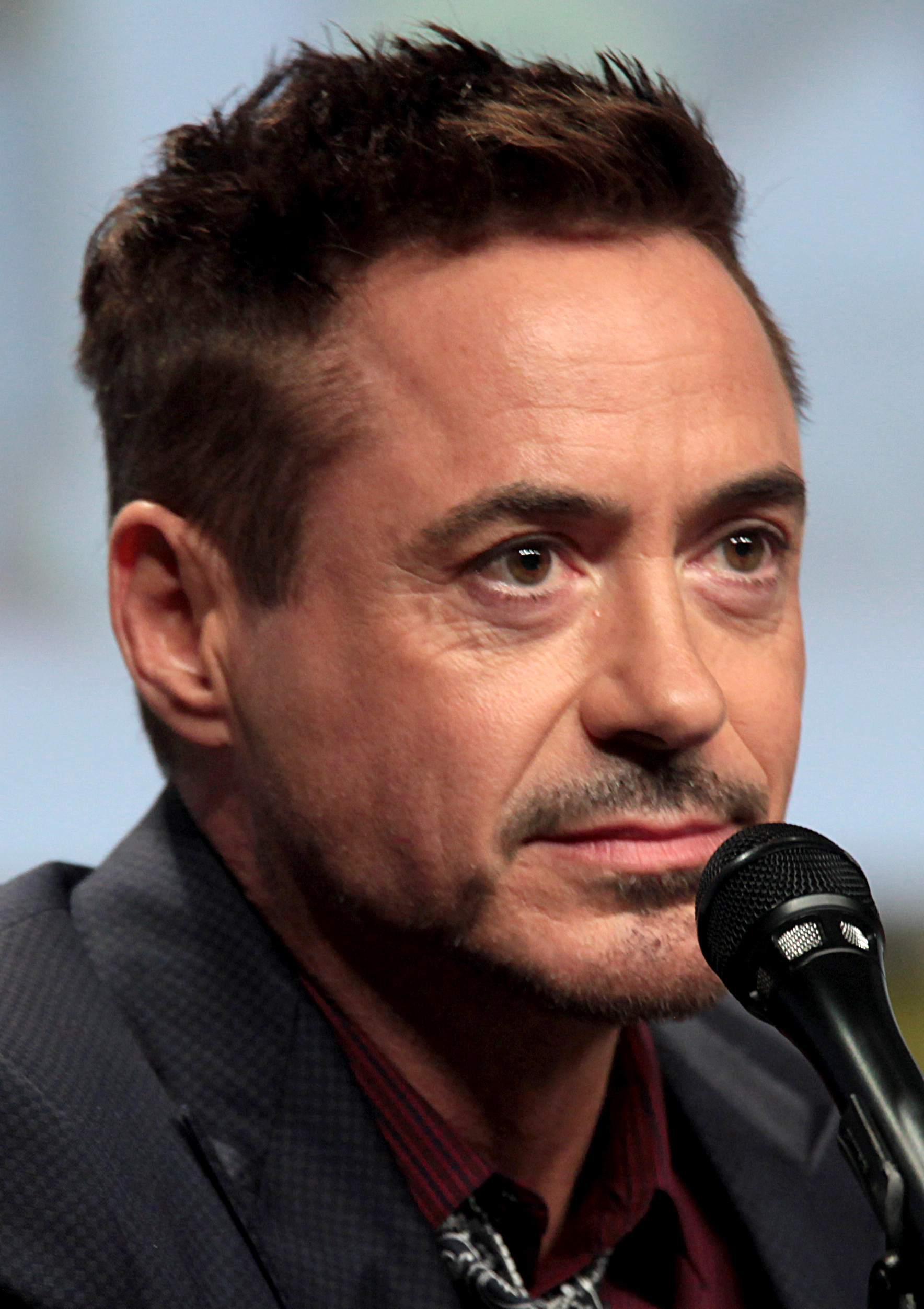
Robert Downey Jr.

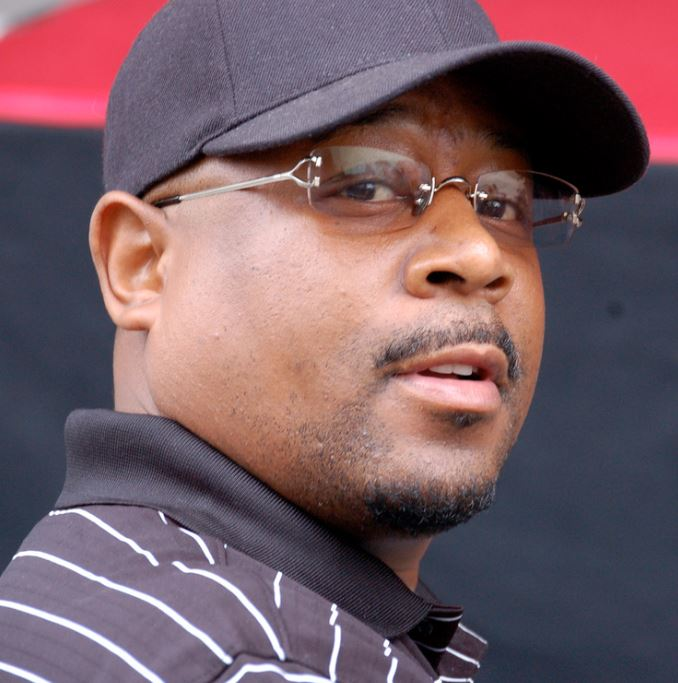
Martin Lawrence

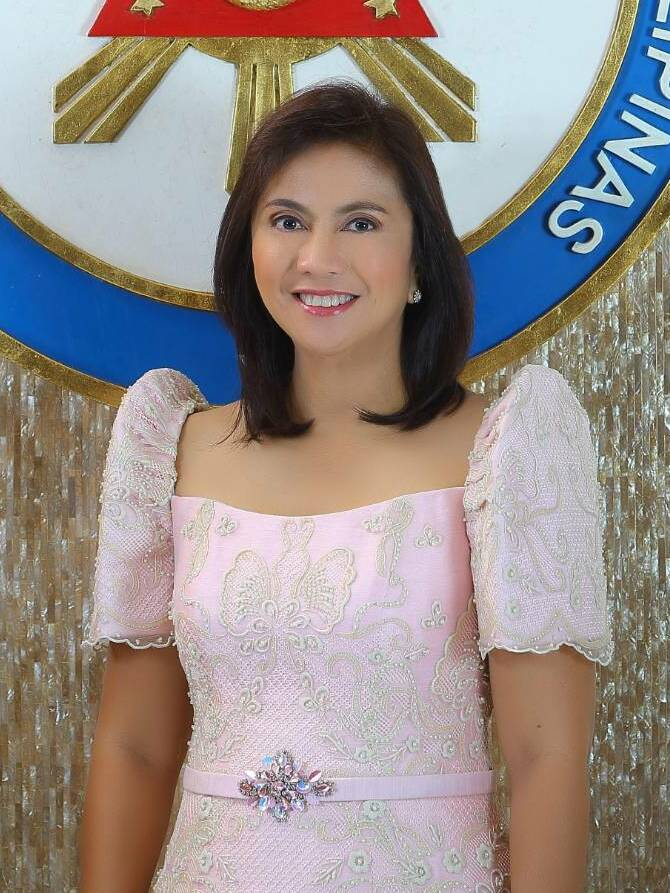
Leni Robredo

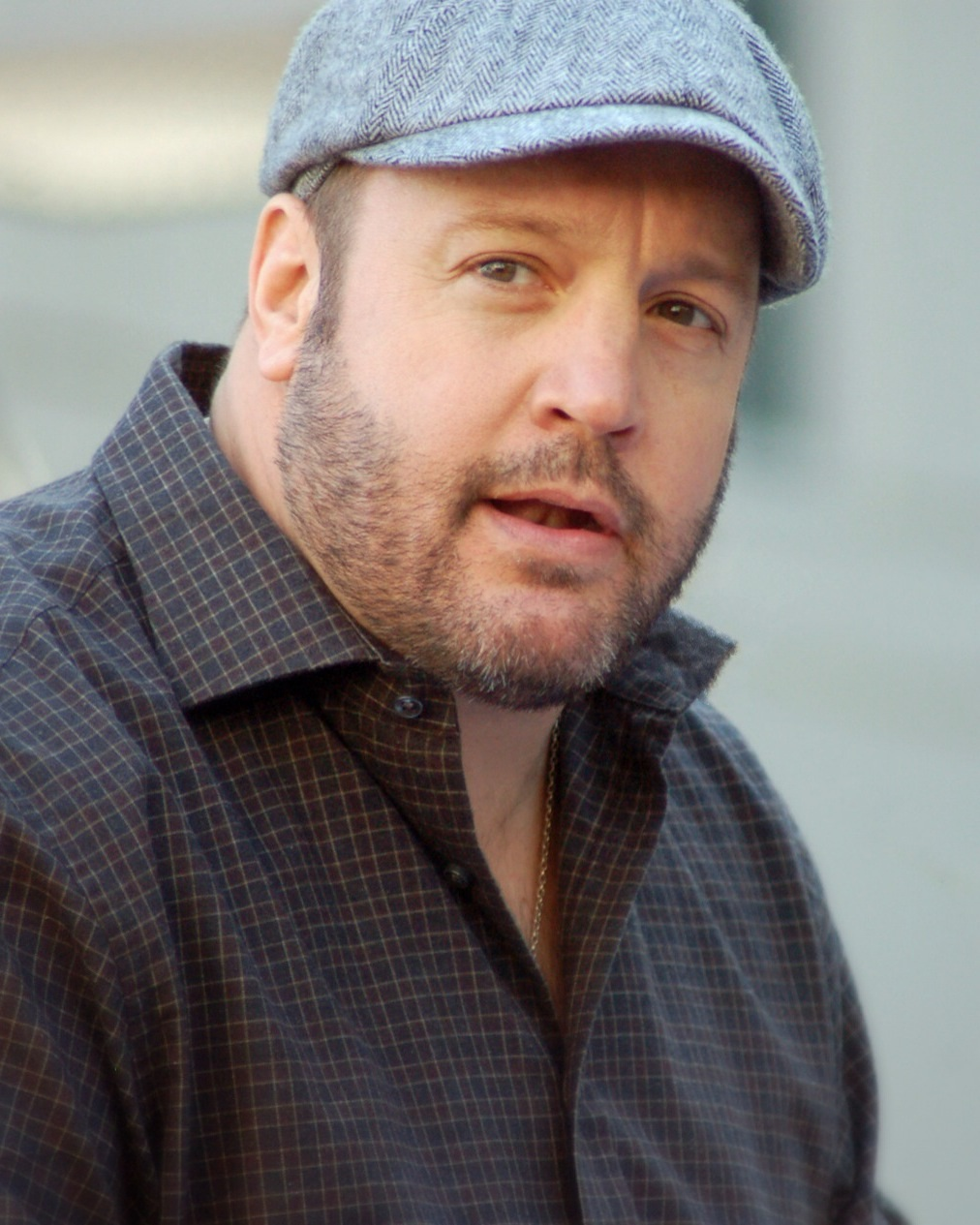
Kevin James

- April 1 – Bekir Bozdağ, Turkish theologian, lawyer, and politician
- April 3 – Nazia Hassan, Pakistani pop singer-songwriter, lawyer and social activist (d. 2000)
- April 4 – Robert Downey Jr., American actor, producer, and singer
- April 6 – Rica Reinisch, German swimmer
- April 9 – Paulina Porizkova, Swedish-American model and actress
- April 10
  - Anna-Leena Härkönen, Finnish author
  - Jure Robič, Slovenian cyclist (d. 2010)
- April 12 – Kim Bodnia, Danish actor and director
- April 15 – Linda Perry, American musician
- April 16 – Martin Lawrence, American actor, comedian, and producer
- April 23 – Leni Robredo, 14th Vice President of the Philippines
- April 24 – Michel Leclerc, French director and screenwriter
- April 25 – Édouard Ferrand, French politician (d. 2018)
- April 26 – Kevin James, American comedian and actor
- April 27 – Edwin Poots, Irish politician
- April 30 – Adrian Pasdar, Iranian-American actor and voice artist

=== May ===
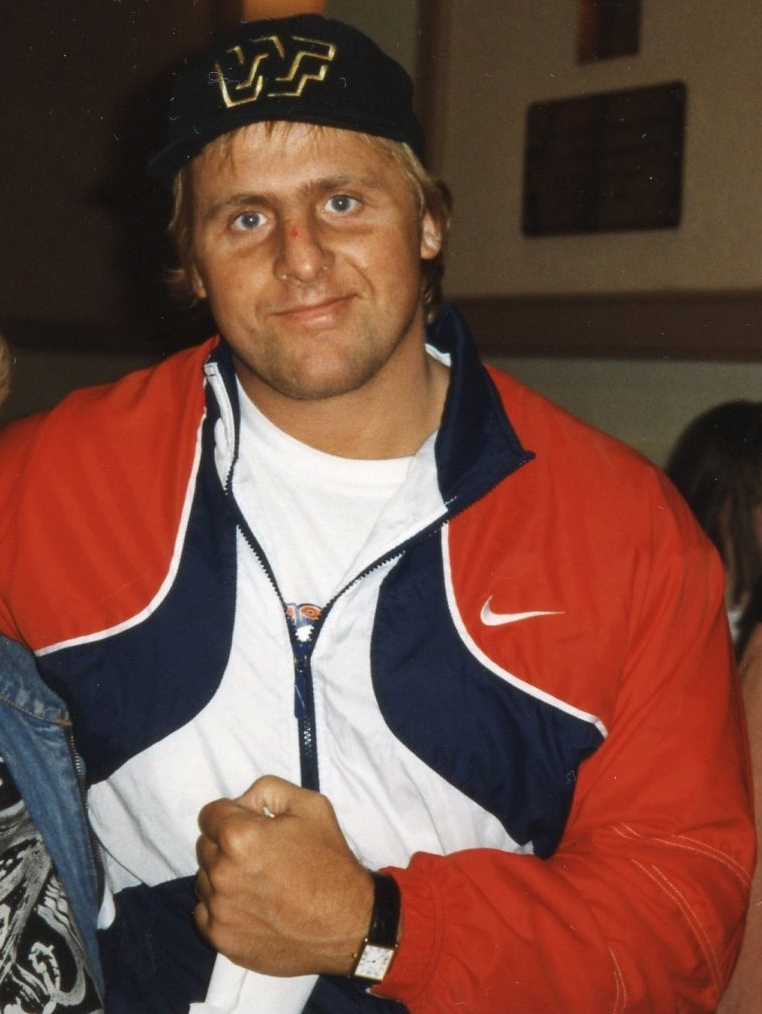
Owen Hart

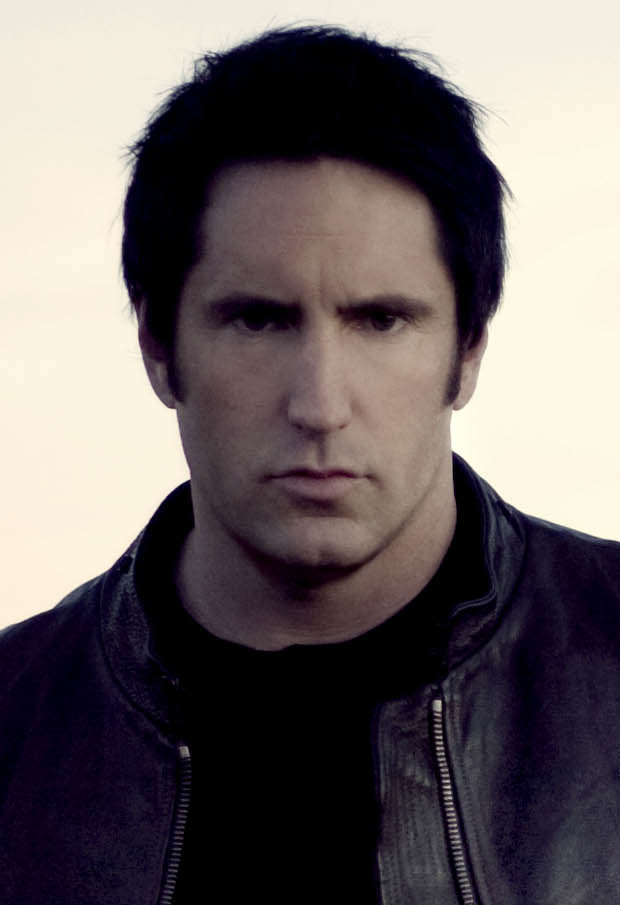
Trent Reznor

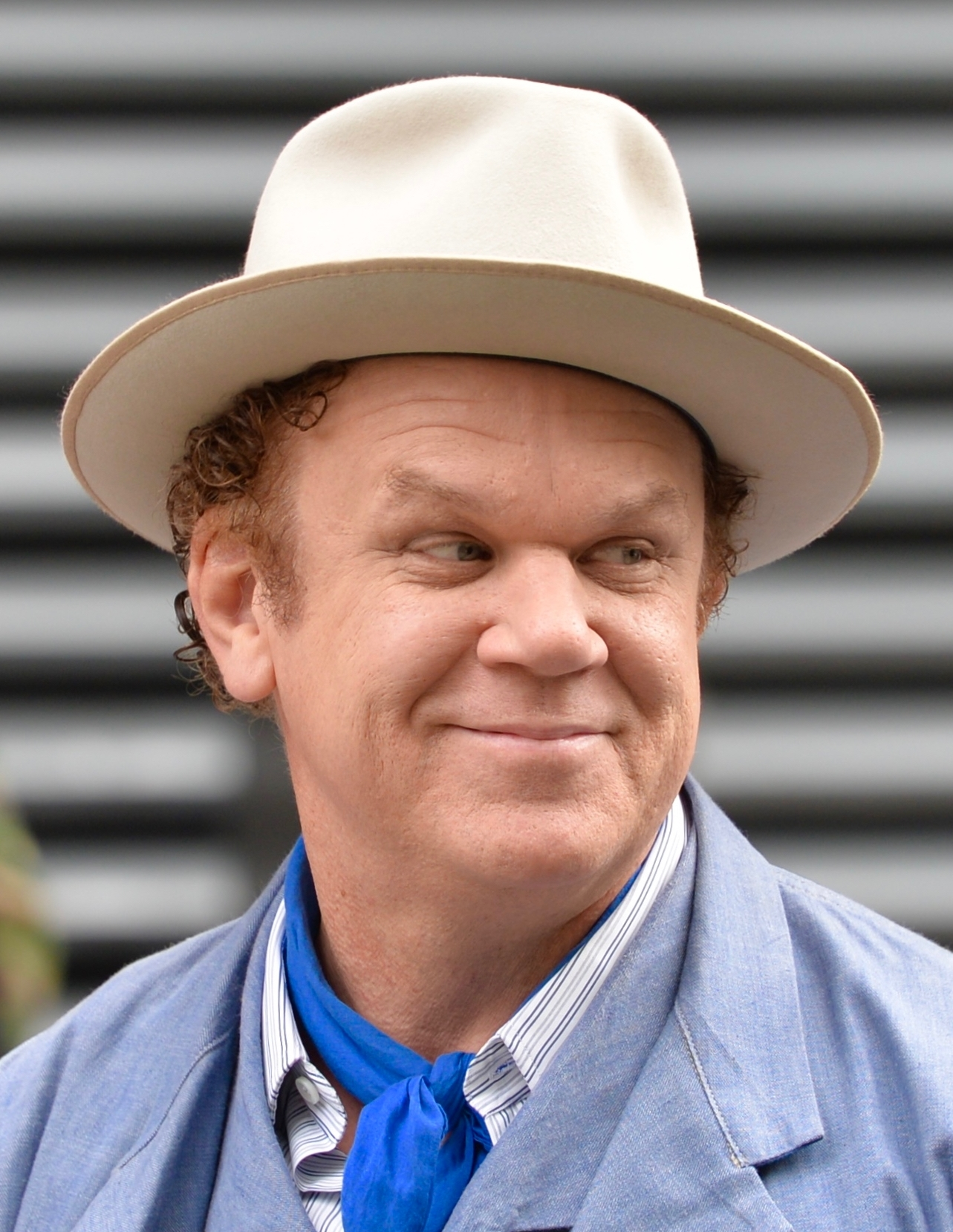
John C. Reilly

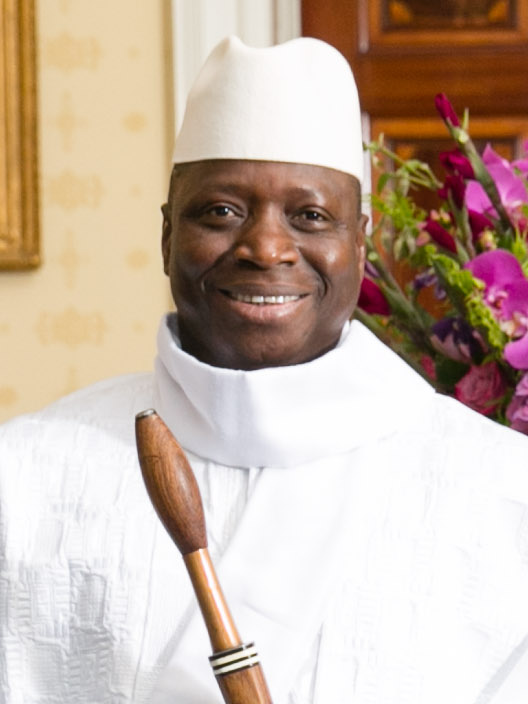
Yahya Jammeh

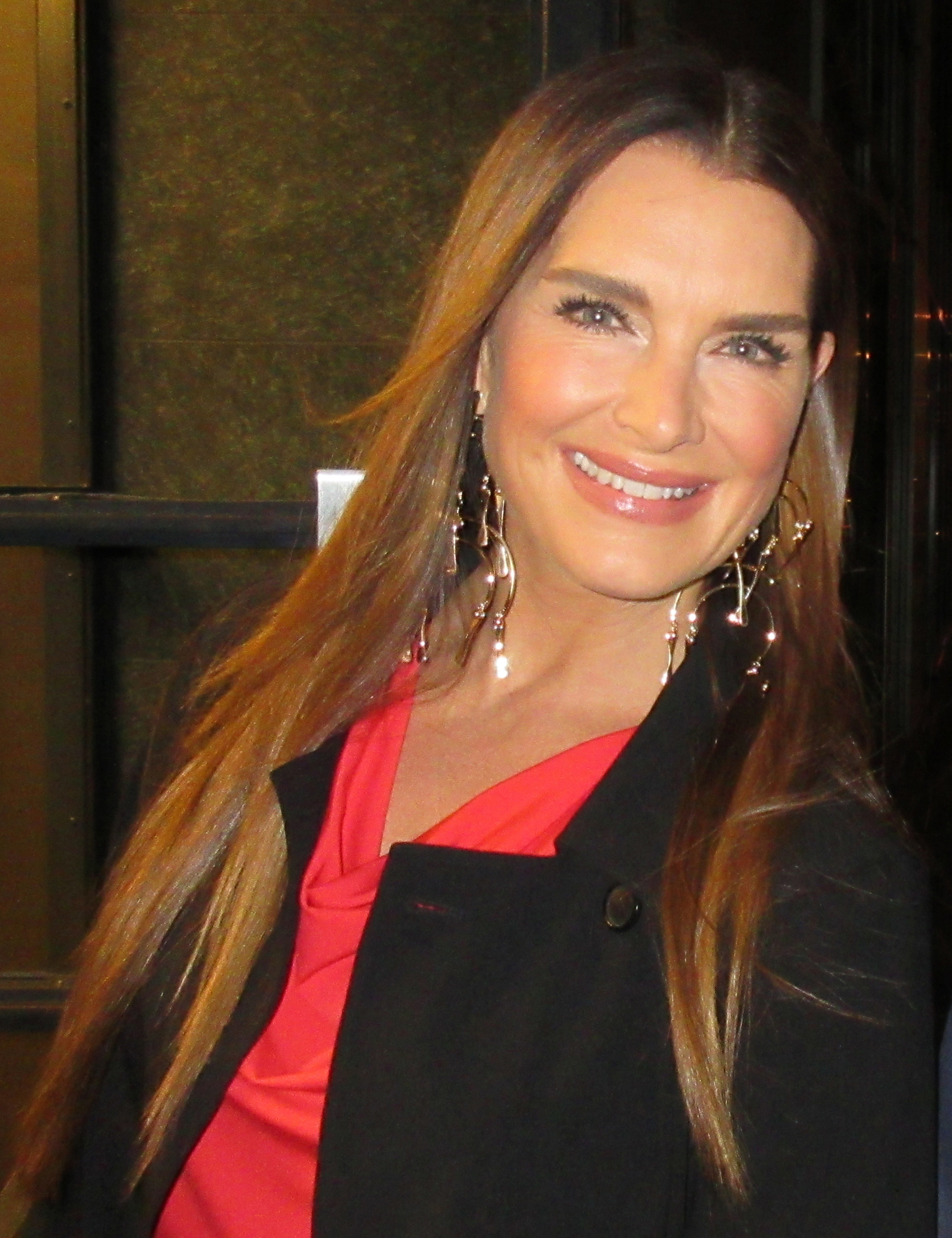
Brooke Shields

- May 2 – Myriam Hernández, Chilean singer
- May 3
  - Gary Mitchell, Irish playwright
  - Rob Brydon, Welsh actor, comedian, impressionist and presenter
- May 7
  - Owen Hart, Canadian professional wrestler (d. 1999)
  - Norman Whiteside, Northern Irish football player
- May 9 – Steve Yzerman, Canadian hockey player
- May 10 – Linda Evangelista, Canadian supermodel
- May 11 – Monsour del Rosario, Filipino Olympic athlete and actor
- May 12 – Renée Simonsen, Danish model and writer
- May 13 – José Antonio Delgado, Venezuelan mountain climber (d. 2006)
- May 14 – Eoin Colfer, Irish novelist
- May 16
  - Rodica Dunca, Romanian artistic gymnast
  - Krist Novoselic, American musician and activist (Nirvana)
- May 17 – Trent Reznor, American rock musician (Nine Inch Nails)
- May 19 – Philippe Dhondt, French singer
- May 23
  - Melissa McBride, American actress (The Walking Dead)
  - Dashan, Canadian comedian based in China
- May 24
  - Carlos Franco, Paraguayan golfer
  - John C. Reilly, American actor and comedian
  - Shinichirō Watanabe, Japanese anime director
- May 25 – Yahya Jammeh, President of the Gambia
- May 29 – Emilio Sánchez, Spanish tennis player
- May 30 – Guadalupe Grande, Spanish poet (d. 2021)
- May 31 – Brooke Shields, American actress and model

=== June ===
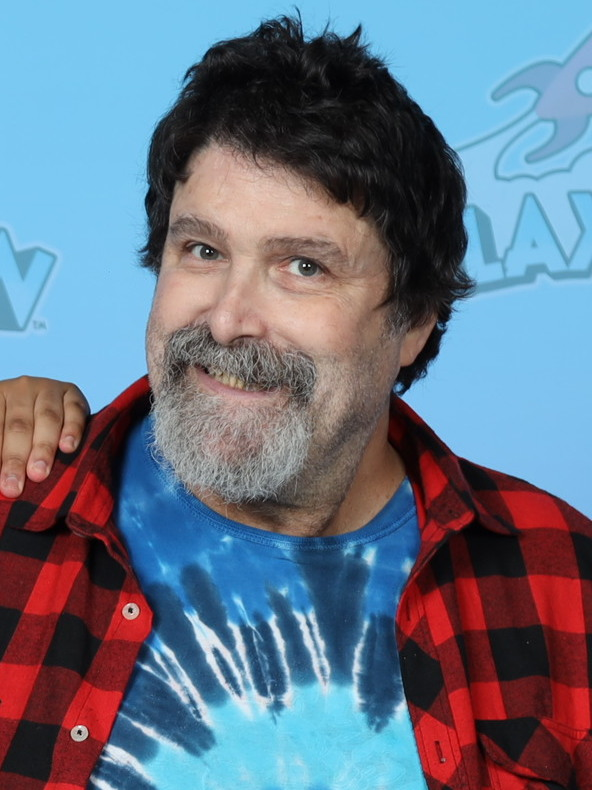
Mick Foley

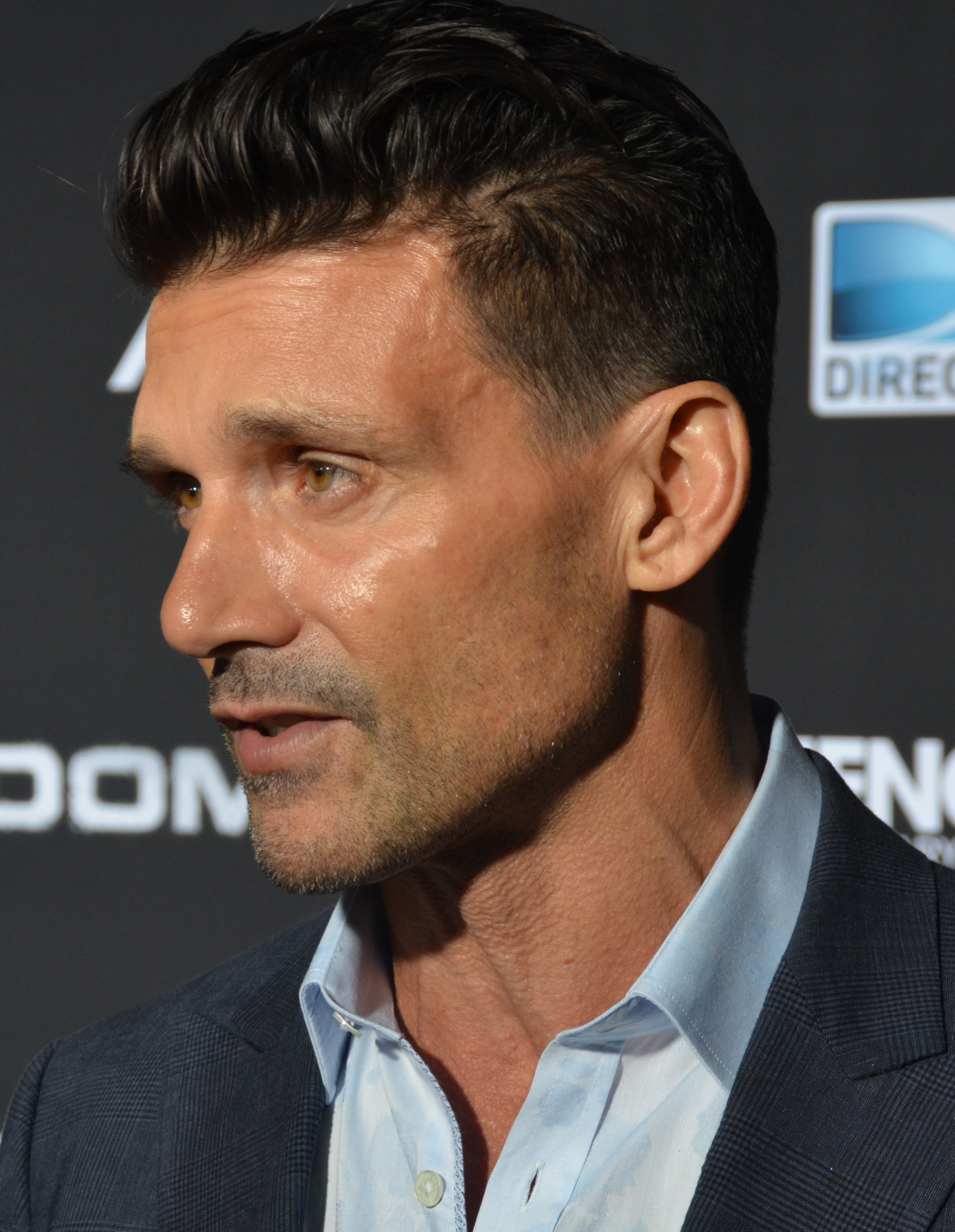
Frank Grillo

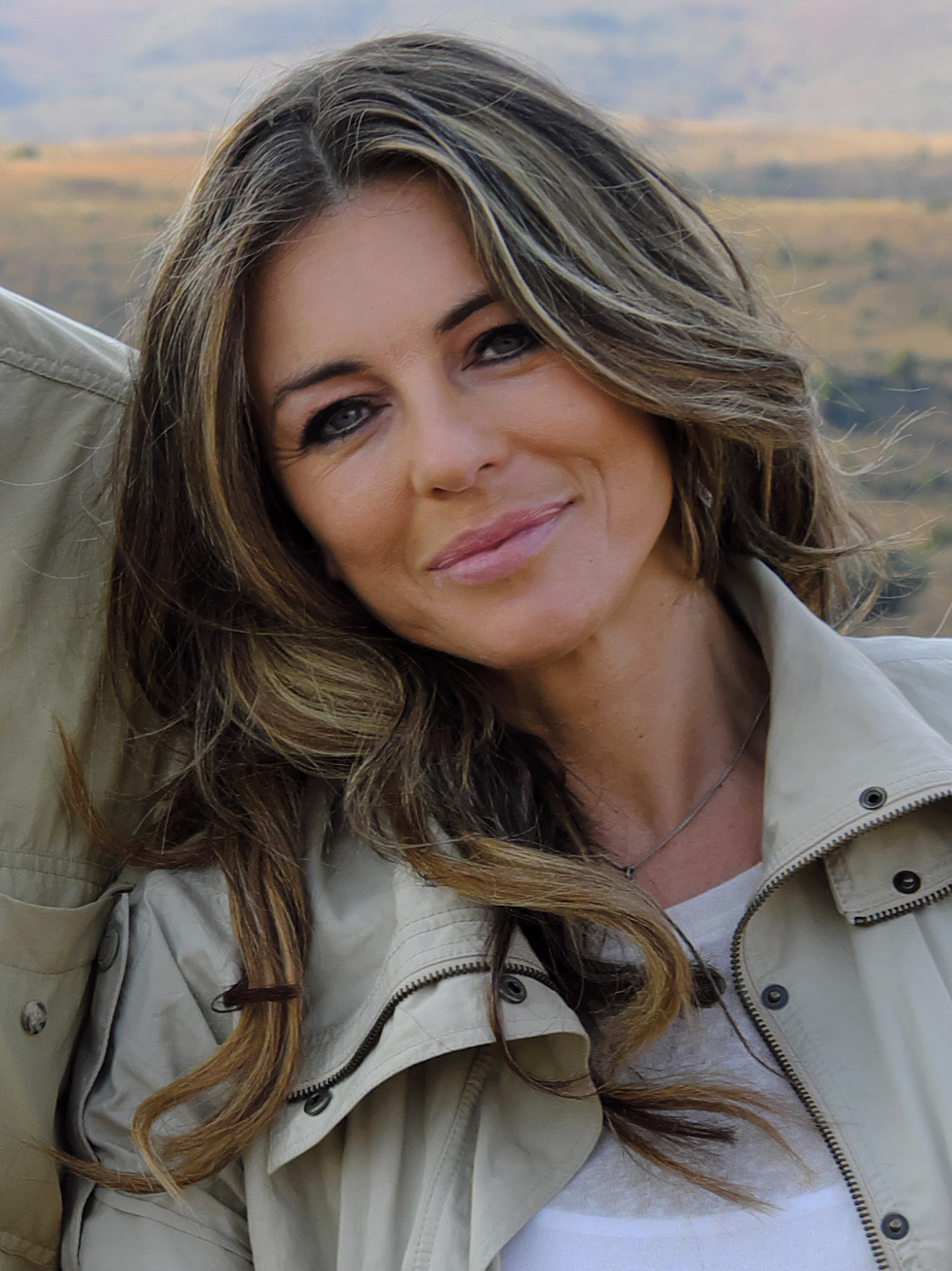
Elizabeth Hurley

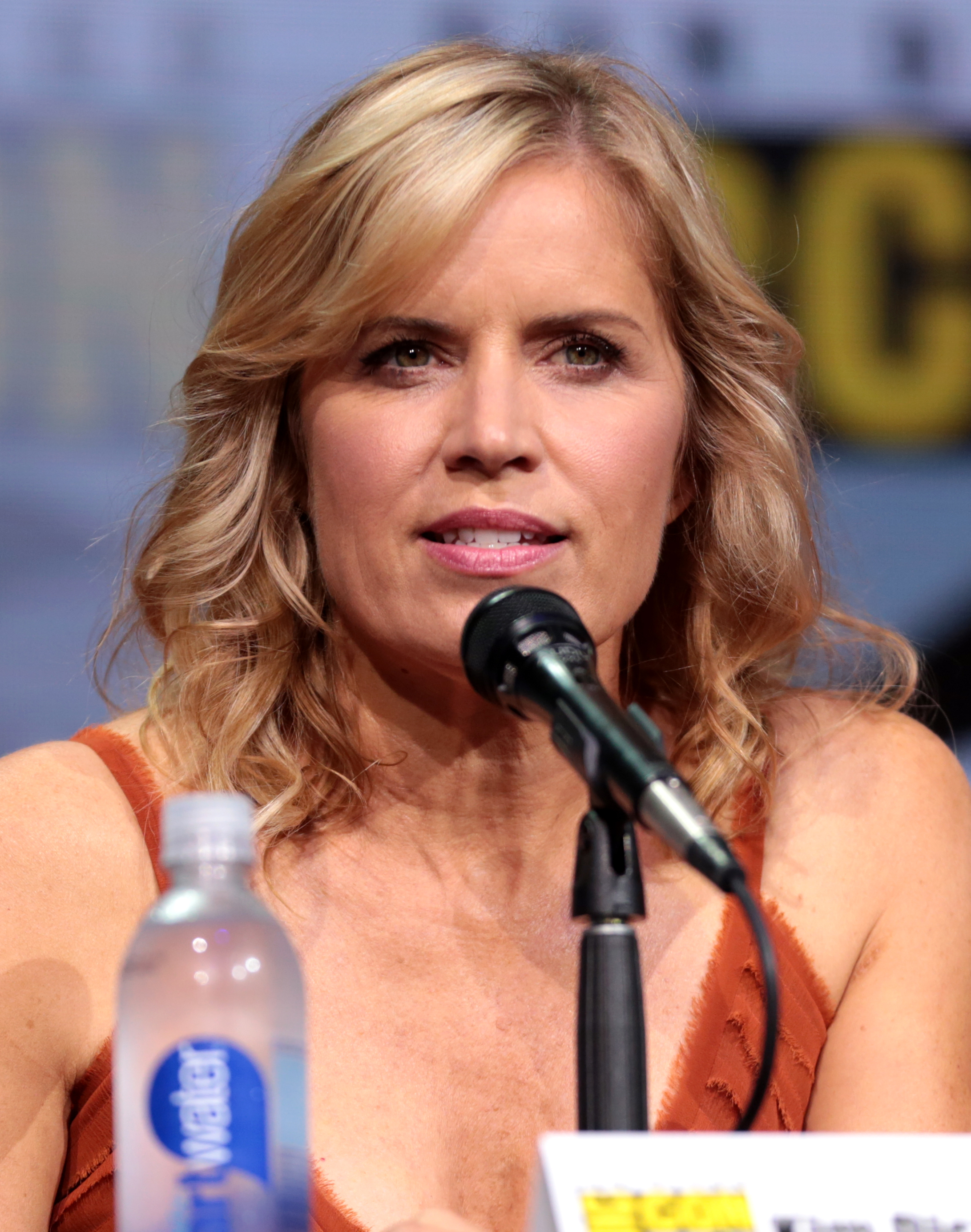
Kim Dickens

- June 1
  - Larisa Lazutina, Russian cross-country skier
  - Nigel Short, English chess player
- June 2 – Steve and Mark Waugh, Australian cricketers
- June 4
  - Mick Doohan, Australian motorcycle racer
  - Andrea Jaeger, American tennis player
- June 6
  - Cam Neely, Canadian ice hockey player
  - Megumi Ogata, Japanese voice actress and singer
- June 7
  - Mick Foley, American professional wrestler
  - Damien Hirst, British artist
  - Christine Roque, French singer
- June 8
  - Frank Grillo, American actor
  - Rob Pilatus, German model, dancer and singer (d. 1998)
- June 10
  - Veronica Ferres, German actress
  - Elizabeth Hurley, English model and actress
- June 11 – Manuel Uribe, morbidly obese Mexican (d. 2014)
- June 12 – Carlos Luis Morales, Ecuadorian journalist (d. 2020)
- June 13 – Infanta Cristina of Spain, Spanish princess
- June 15 – Bernard Hopkins, American boxer
- June 16 – Andrea M. Ghez, American astronomer, recipient of the Nobel Prize in Physics
- June 17
  - Dana Eskelson, American actress
  - Dan Jansen, American speedskater
  - Dara O'Kearney, Irish ultra runner and professional poker player
- June 21
  - Yang Liwei, Chinese major general, military pilot and China National Space Administration astronaut
  - Gabriella Selmeczi, Hungarian jurist and politician
- June 22 – Anubhav Sinha, Indian film director
- June 23 – Paul Arthurs, English Musician (Oasis)
- June 24 – Son Hyun-joo, South Korean actor
- June 25 – Jean Castex, French politician
- June 26 – Jana Hybášková, Czech politician and diplomat
- June 28 – Belayneh Dinsamo, Ethiopian long-distance runner
- June 29
  - Véronique Laury, French businesswoman
  - Dado Villa-Lobos, Brazilian musician
  - Matthew Weiner, American television writer, director and producer
- June 30
  - Philippe Duquesne, French actor
  - Cho Jae-hyun, South Korean actor
  - Mitch Richmond, American basketball player

=== July ===
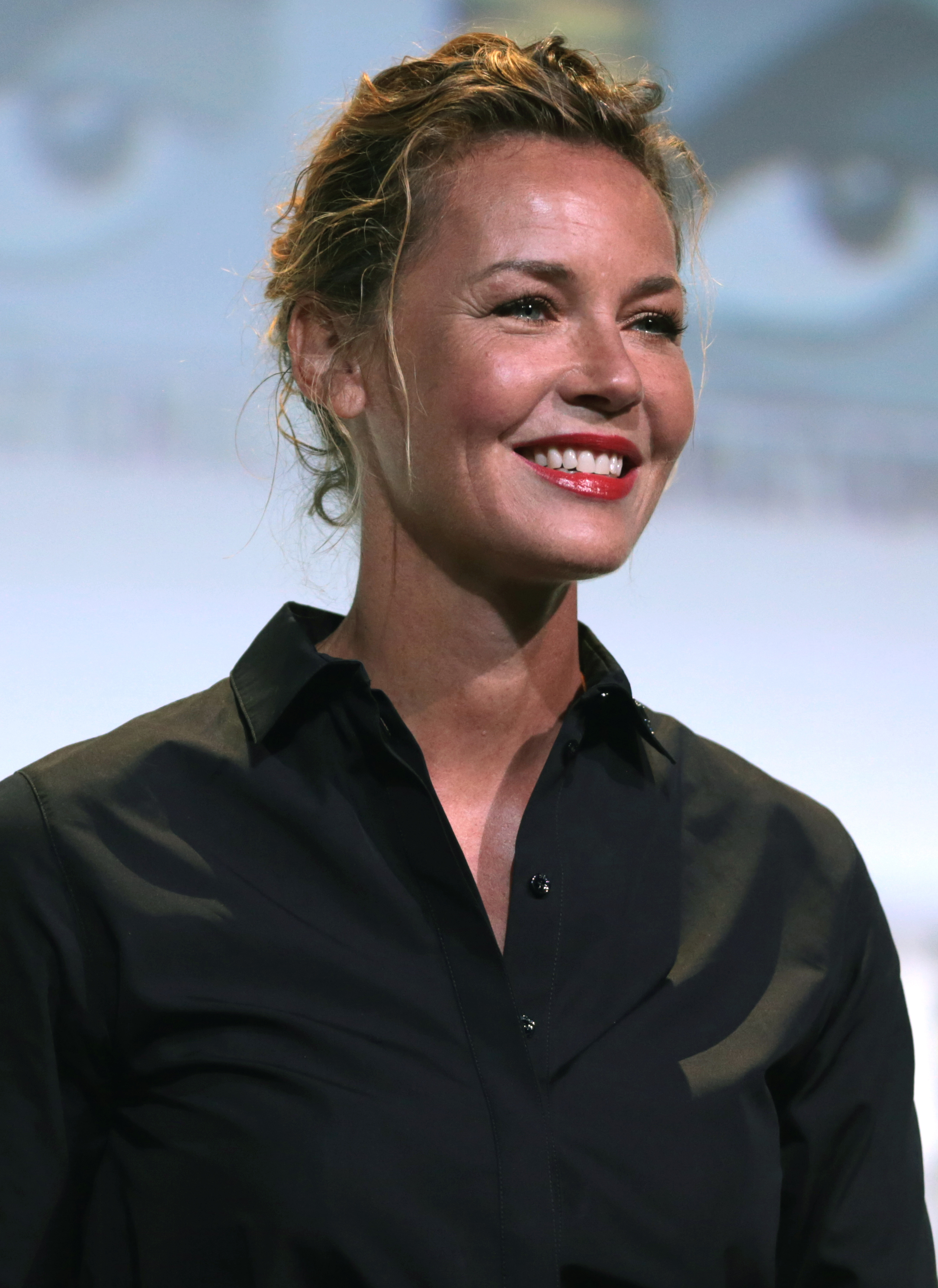
Connie Nielsen

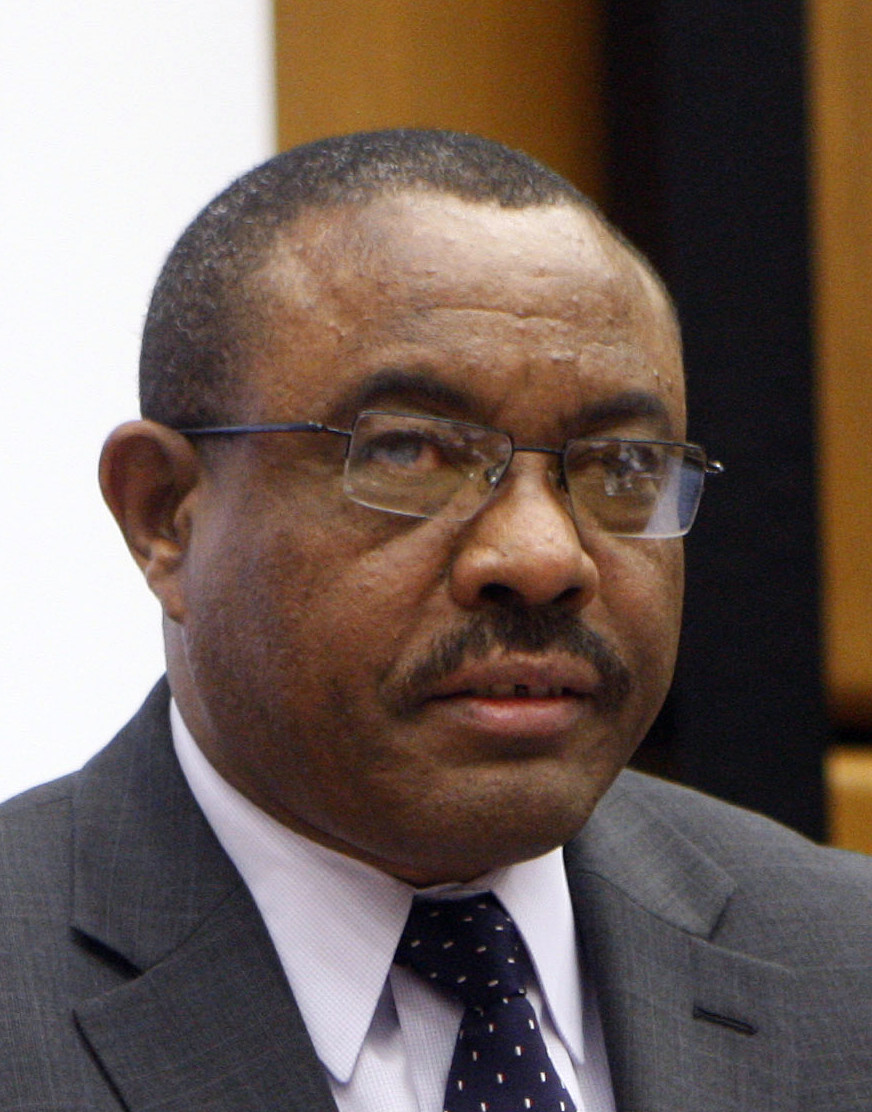
Hailemariam Desalegn

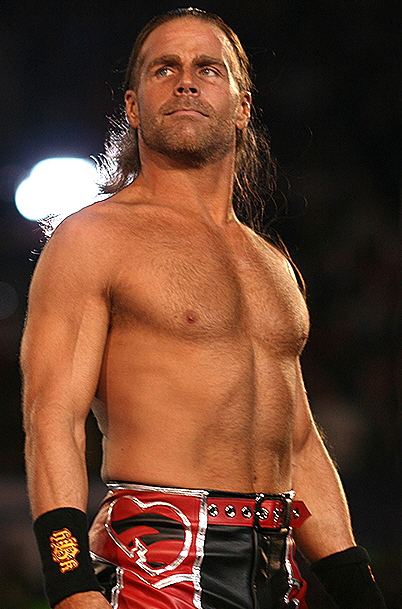
Shawn Michaels

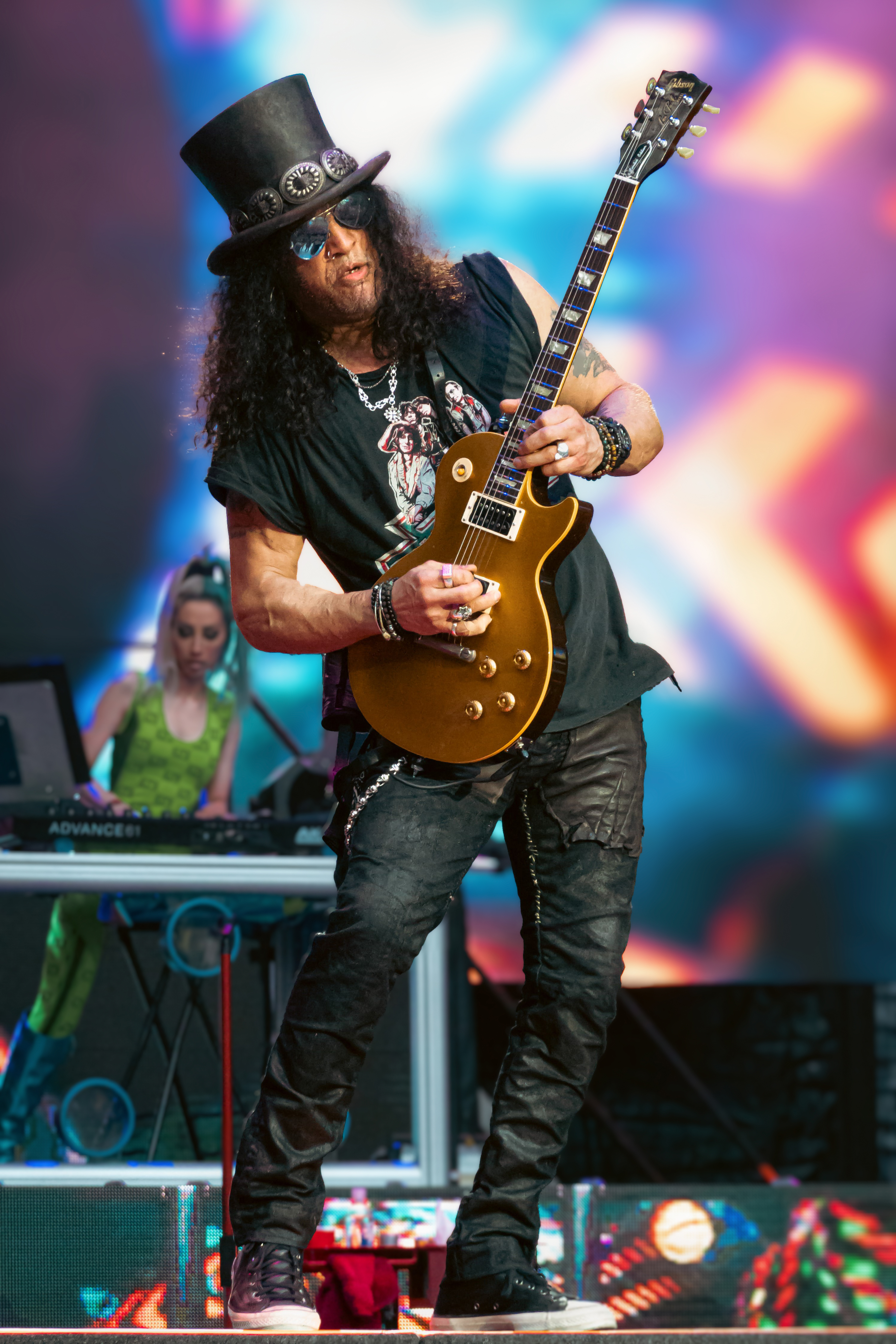
Slash

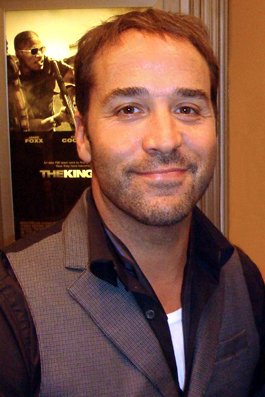
Jeremy Piven

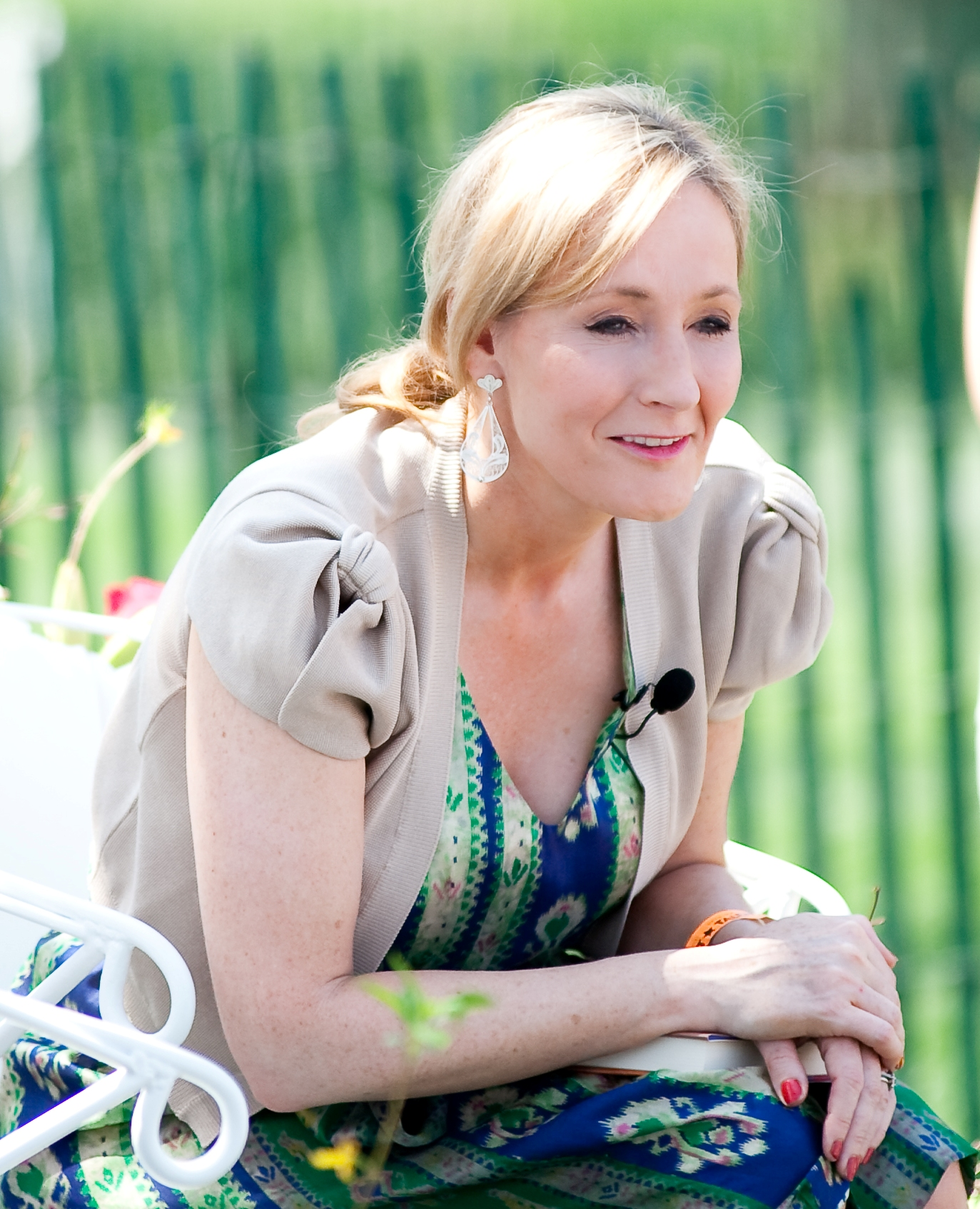
J. K. Rowling

- July 1
  - Carl Fogarty, English motorcycle racer
  - Mohammed Abdul Hussein, Iraqi former footballer
  - Ramdas Ambatkar, Indian politician, Maharashtra MLC (d. 2025)
- July 3
  - Shinya Hashimoto, Japanese professional wrestler (d. 2005)
  - Connie Nielsen, Danish actress
  - Tommy Flanagan, Scottish actor
- July 4 – Tracy Letts, American actor, playwright and screenwriter
- July 5
  - Kathryn Erbe, American actress
  - Eyran Katsenelenbogen, Israeli jazz pianist
- July 7 – Paula Devicq, Canadian actress
- July 10
  - Danny Boffin, Belgian footballer
  - Princess Alexia of Greece and Denmark
- July 11 – Ernesto Hoost, Dutch kickboxer
- July 12 – Mama Kandeh, Gambian politician
- July 13 – Akina Nakamori, Japanese singer and actress
- July 14 – Lou Savarese, American boxer
- July 15 – Dafna Rechter, Israeli actress and singer
- July 17
  - Santiago Segura, Spanish actor, screenwriter, producer and director
  - Rosa Gumataotao Rios, 43rd Treasurer of the United States
  - Alex Winter, British actor
- July 18 – Eva Ionesco, French actress, film director and screenwriter
- July 19
  - Dame Evelyn Glennie, Scottish virtuoso percussionist
  - Hailemariam Desalegn, 15th Prime Minister of Ethiopia
- July 21 – Guðni Bergsson, Icelandic footballer
- July 22 – Shawn Michaels, American professional wrestler
- July 23
  - Grace Mugabe, First Lady of Zimbabwe
  - Slash (Saul Hudson), English-born American rock guitarist
- July 26
  - Vladimir Cruz, Cuban actor
  - Jeremy Piven, American actor
- July 27
  - José Luis Chilavert, Paraguayan footballer
  - Trifon Ivanov, Bulgarian footballer (d. 2016)
- July 28 – Daniela Mercury, Brazilian singer, songwriter, dancer, producer, actress and television host
- July 31 – J. K. Rowling, English author

=== August ===
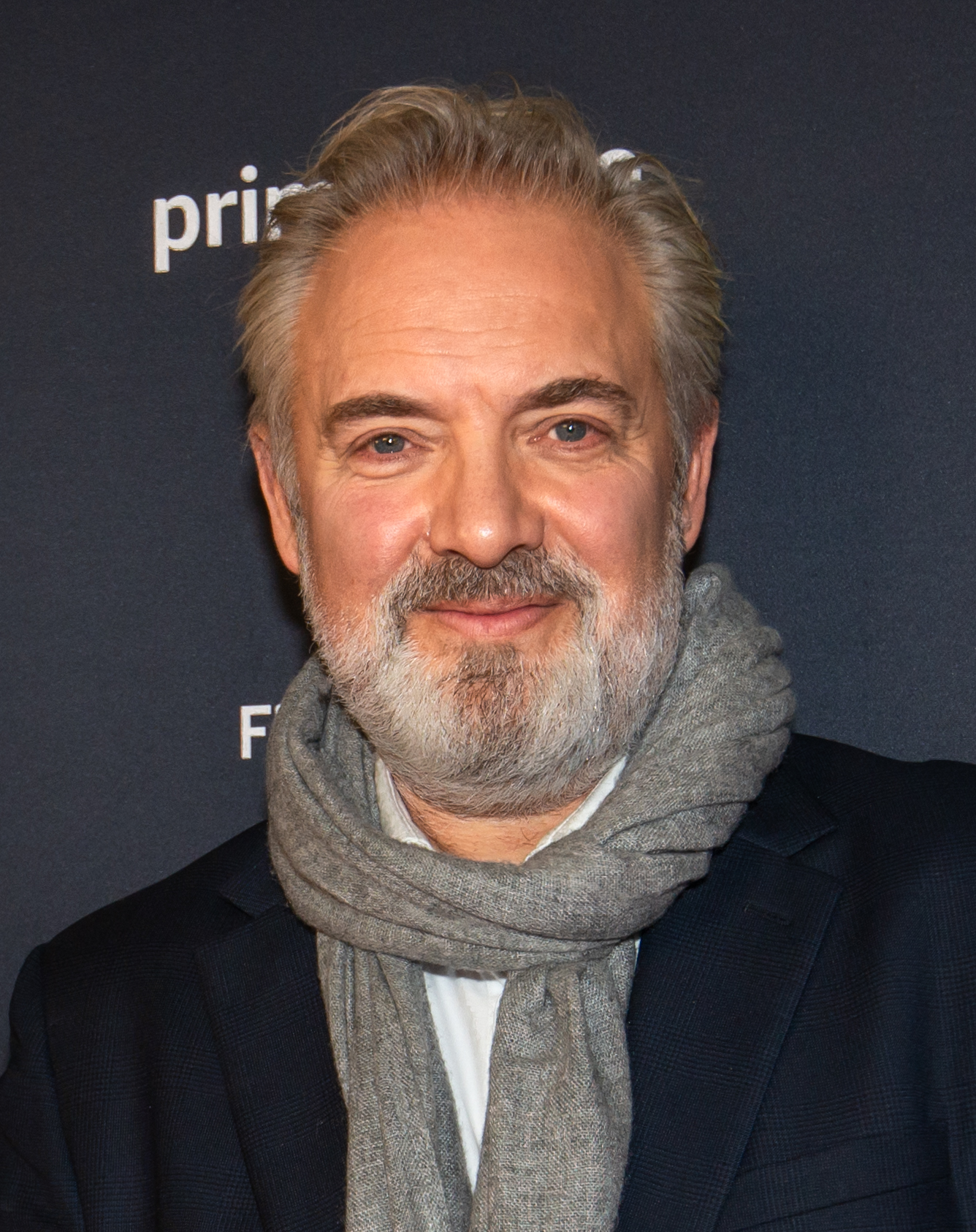
Sir Sam Mendes

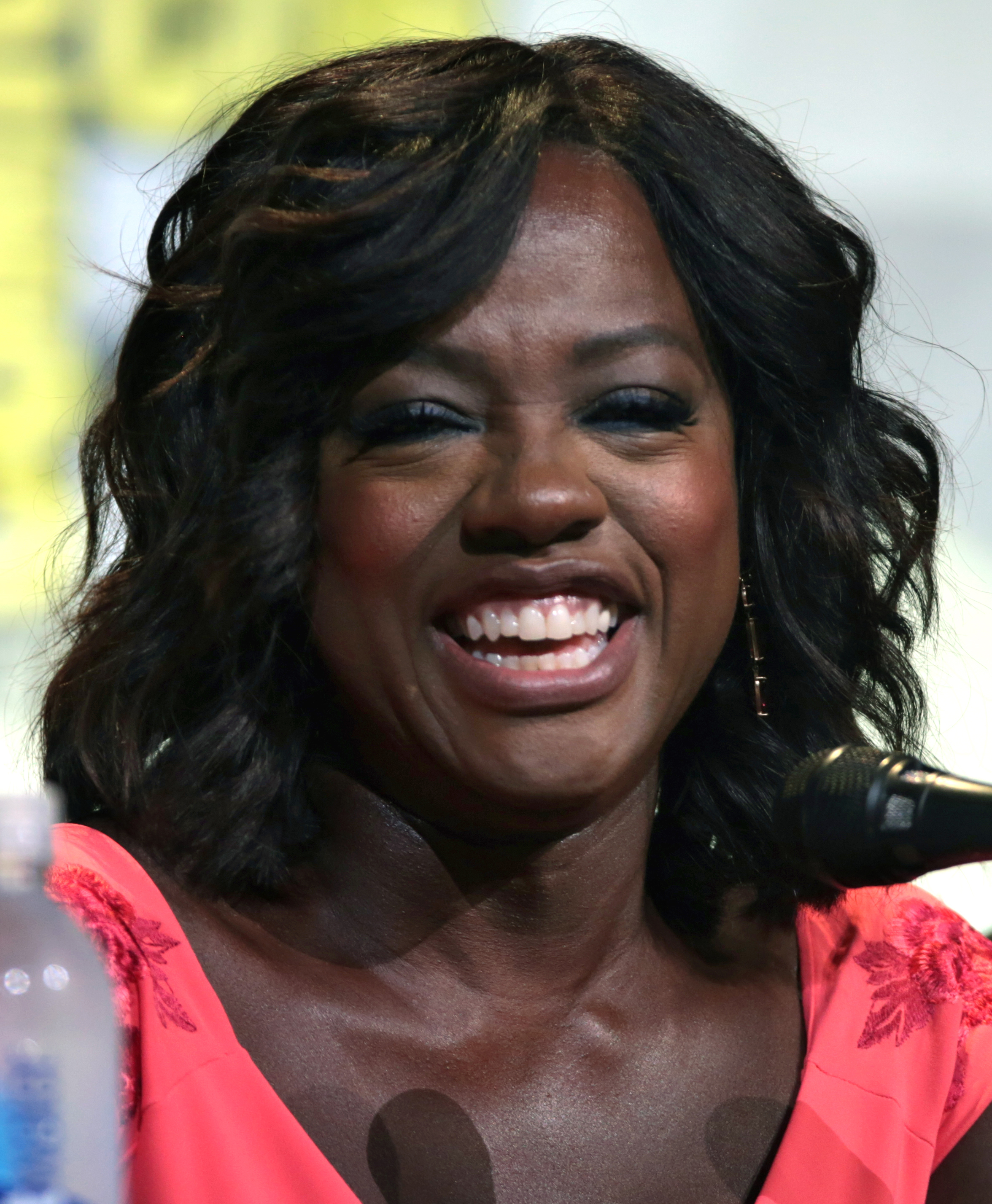
Viola Davis

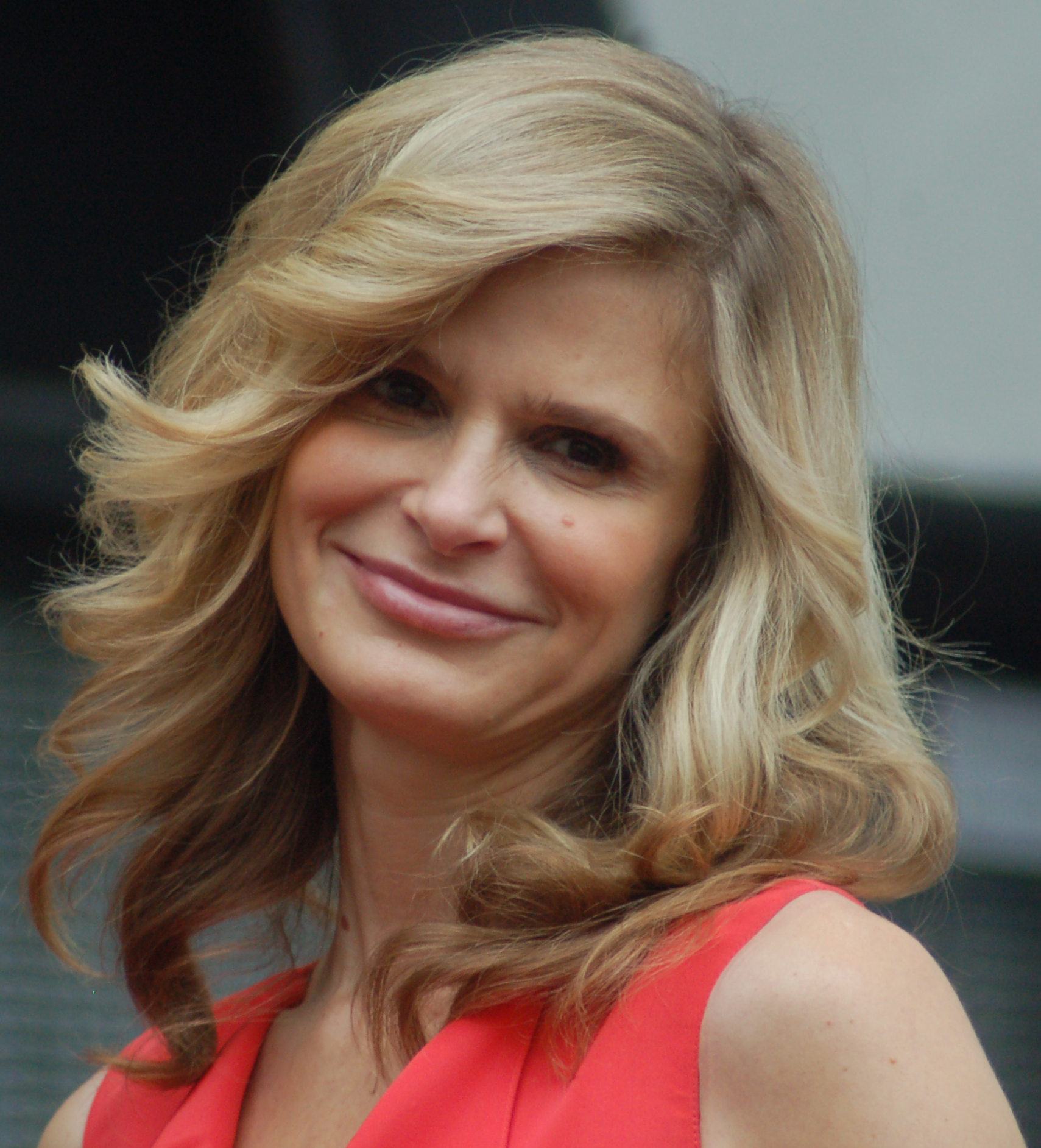
Kyra Sedgwick

- August 1 – Sam Mendes, English film director
- August 2
  - Sandra Ng, Hong Kong actress
  - Hisanobu Watanabe, Japanese baseball player and coach
- August 4
  - Terri Lyne Carrington, American jazz drummer
  - Dennis Lehane, American crime writer
  - Fredrik Reinfeldt, Swedish Prime Minister
- August 5 – Monica Ward, Italian actress and voice actress
- August 6 – David Robinson, American basketball player
- August 10 – Claudia Christian, American actress, writer, singer, musician, and director
- August 11 – Viola Davis, African-American actress
- August 15 – Vincent Kok, Hong Kong director and actor
- August 19
  - Kevin Dillon, American actor
  - Maria de Medeiros, Portuguese actress
  - Kyra Sedgwick, American actress
  - James Tomkins, Australian rower
- August 22 – David Reimer, Canadian man, born male but reassigned female and raised as a girl after a botched circumcision (d. 2004)
- August 24 – Reggie Miller, American basketball player and commentator
- August 25 – Mia Zapata, American singer (d. 1993)
- August 26 – Azela Robinson, Mexican actress
- August 28
  - Satoshi Tajiri, Japanese video game designer and Pokémon creator
  - Amanda Tapping, Canadian actress
  - Shania Twain, Canadian country singer and songwriter
- August 31 – Daniel Bernhardt, Swiss actor and martial artist

=== September ===
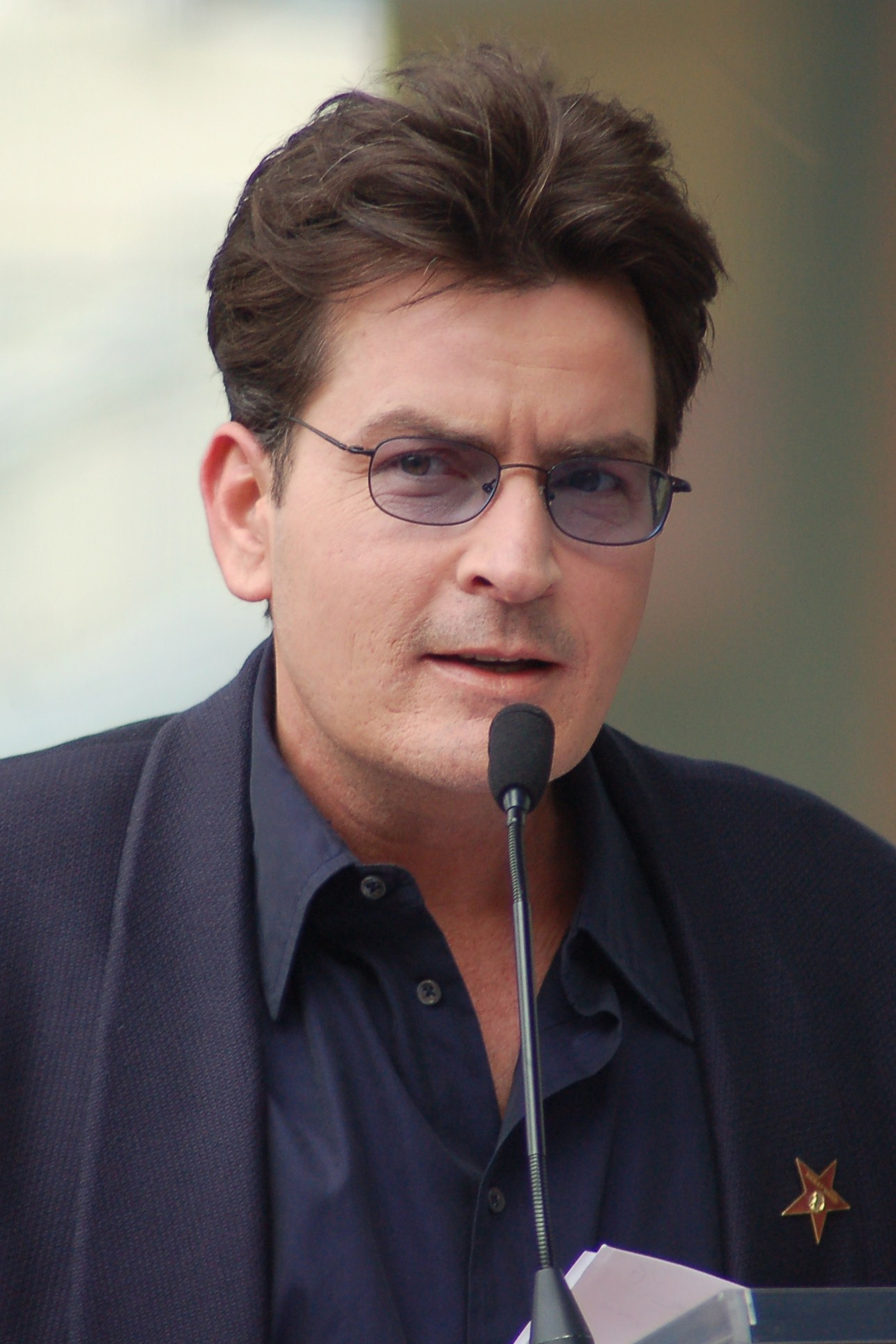
Charlie Sheen

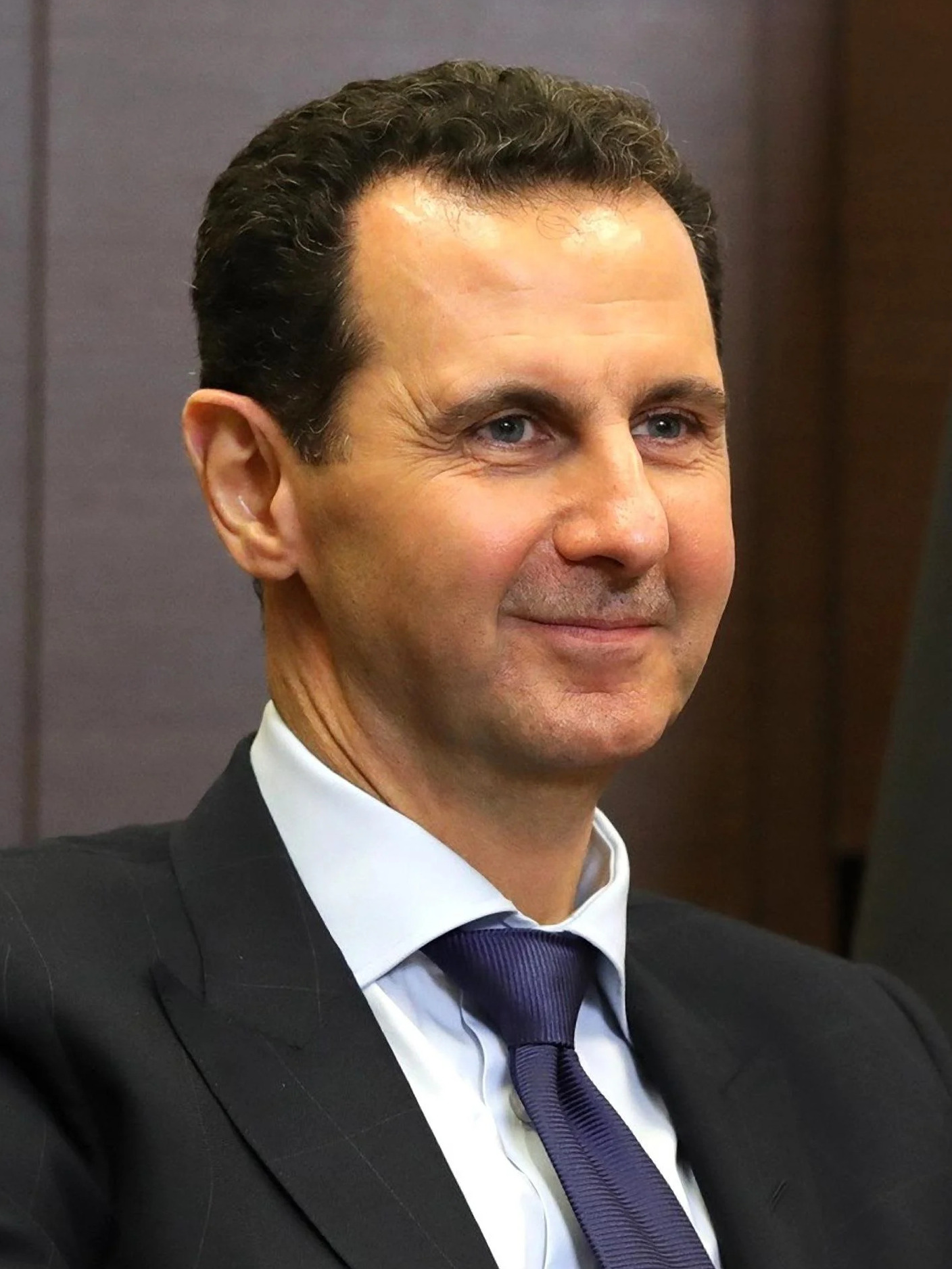
Bashar al-Assad

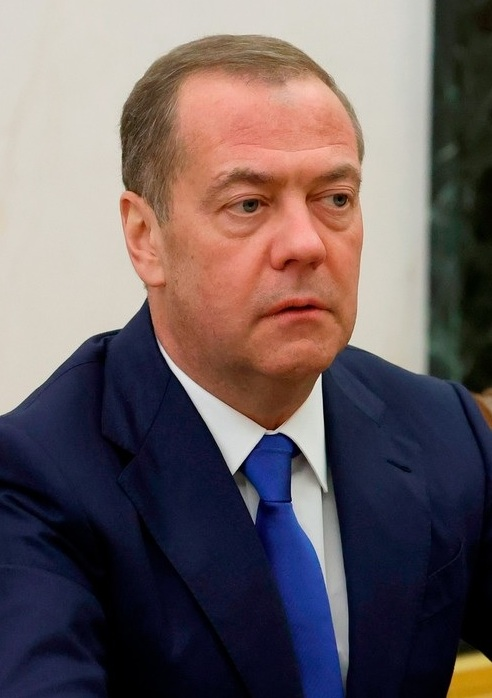
Dmitry Medvedev

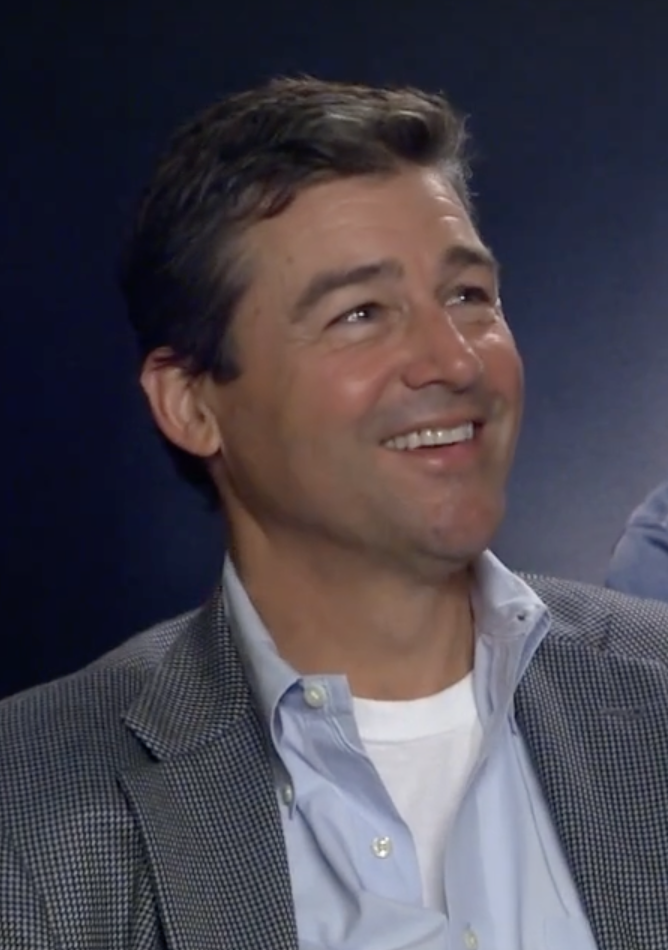
Kyle Chandler

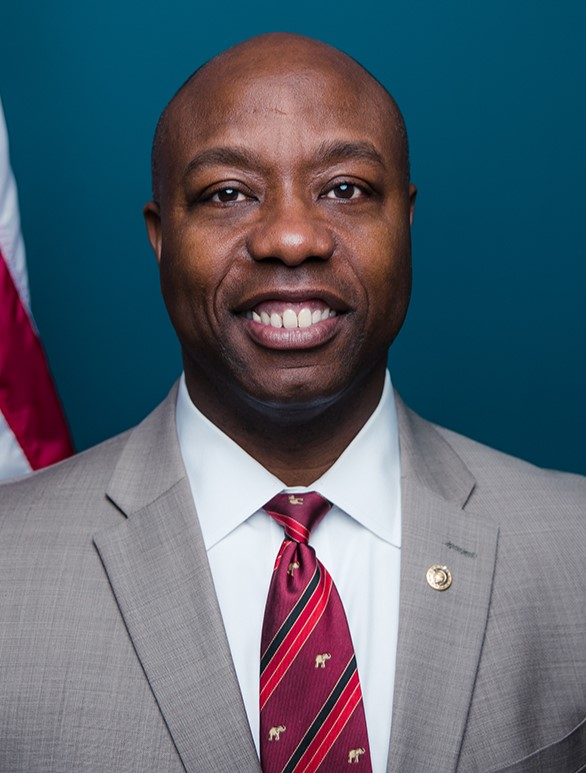
Tim Scott

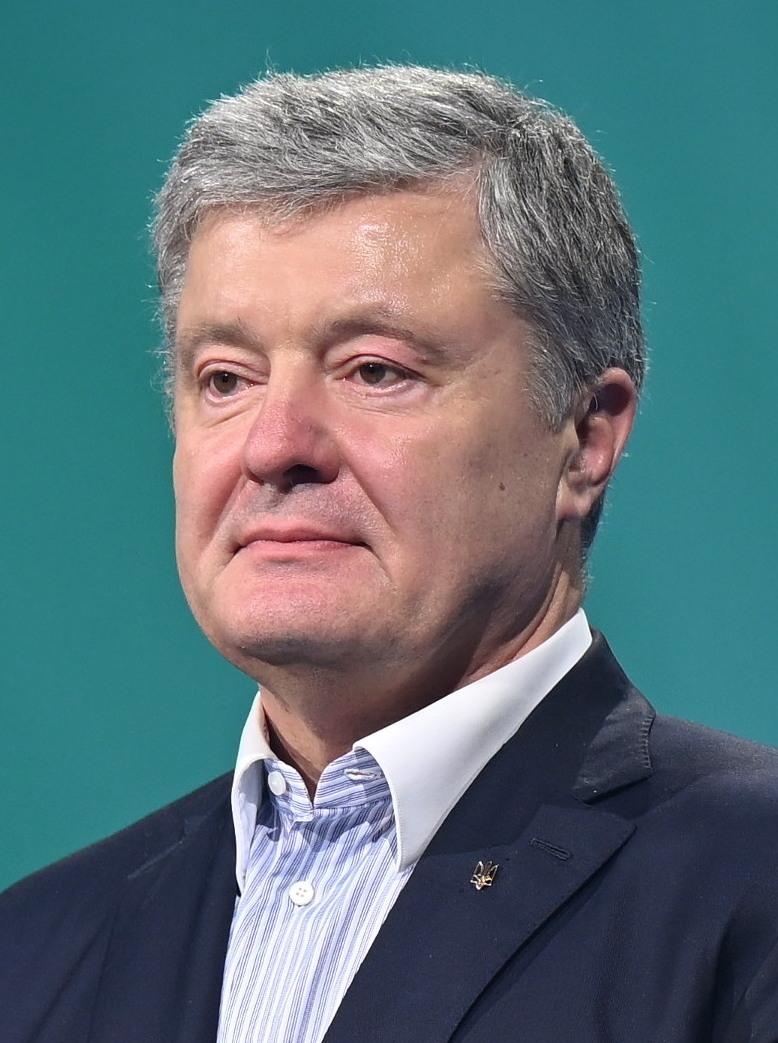
Petro Poroshenko

- September 1 – Craig McLachlan, Australian actor and singer
- September 2 – Lennox Lewis, British boxer
- September 3
  - Costas Mandylor, Greek-Australian actor
  - Charlie Sheen, American actor and producer
- September 5 – Derby Makinka, Zambian footballer (d. 1993)
- September 7 – Jörg Pilawa, German television presenter
- September 8
  - Juliana Stratton, American politician, Senator-elector from Illinois
  - Darlene Zschech, Australian singer and worship leader
- September 10 – Marco Pastors, Dutch politician
- September 11
  - Bashar al-Assad, Syrian politician, former President of Syria
  - Moby, American musician
- September 12
  - Einstein Kristiansen, Norwegian cartoonist, designer, and television host
- September 14 – Dmitry Medvedev, former President of Russia
- September 15 – Fernanda Torres, Brazilian actress
- September 16 – Katy Kurtzman, American actress, director and producer
- September 17 – Yuji Naka, Japanese video game programmer
- September 19
  - Goldie, English record producer and DJ
  - Iliya Lazarov, Bulgarian politician
  - Tim Scott, African-American politician and businessman
  - Tshering Tobgay, former Prime Minister of Bhutan
- September 21
  - Cheryl Hines, American actress
  - Johanna Vuoksenmaa, Finnish film director
  - David Wenham, Australian actor
  - Pramila Jayapal, American politician
- September 23 – Mark Woodforde, Australian tennis player
- September 25 – Scottie Pippen, American basketball player
- September 26
  - Radisav Ćurčić, Serbian-Israeli basketball player
  - Alexei Mordashov, Russian businessman
  - Petro Poroshenko, former President of Ukraine
- September 27 – Steve Kerr, American basketball player

=== October ===
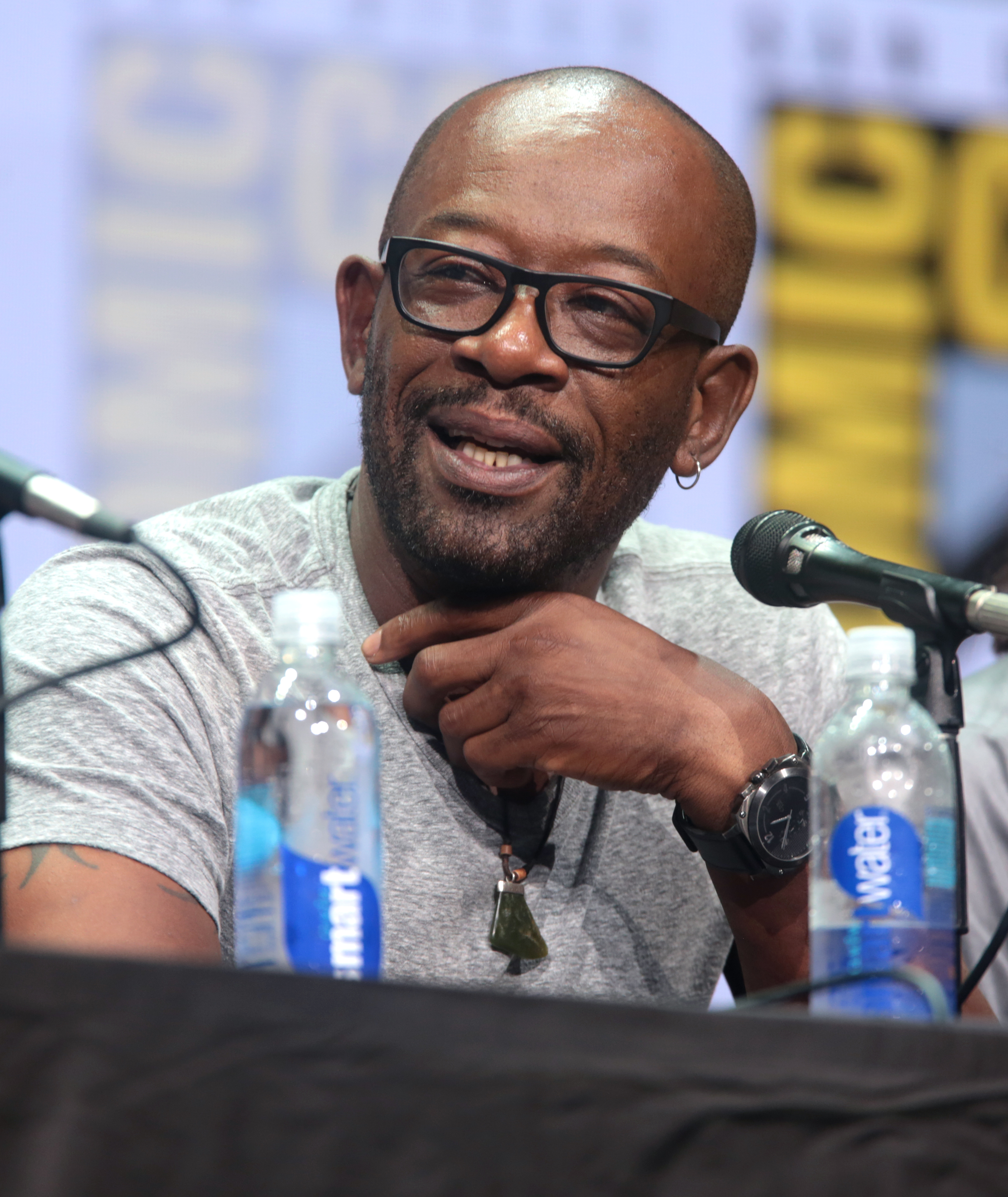
Lennie James

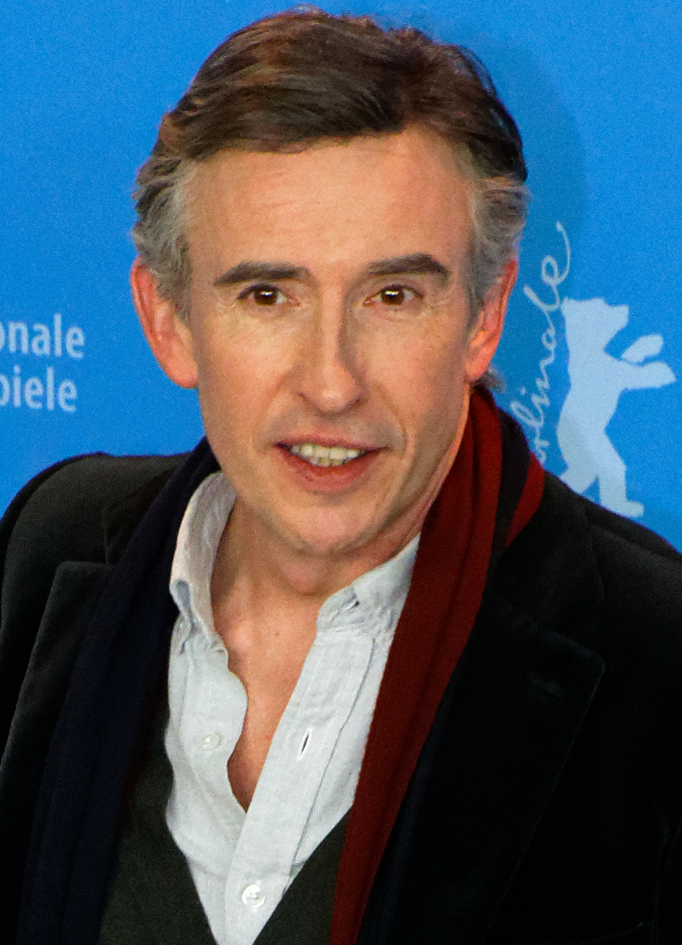
Steve Coogan

- October 1 – Andreas Keller, German field hockey player
- October 2
  - Gerardo Reyero, Mexican voice actor
  - Ferhan and Ferzan Önder, Turkish-Austrian pianists
- October 3
  - Adriana Calcanhotto, Brazilian singer and composer
  - Jan-Ove Waldner, Swedish table tennis player
- October 5
  - Mario Lemieux, Canadian ice hockey player
  - Patrick Roy, Canadian ice hockey player
- October 6 – Steve Scalise, House Majority Whip and U.S. Representative of Louisiana's 1st district
- October 8
  - Matt Biondi, American swimmer
  - C. J. Ramone, American musician
- October 9 – Dionicio Cerón, Mexican long-distance runner
- October 10 – Chris Penn, American actor (d. 2006)
- October 11
  - Julianne McNamara, American artistic gymnast
  - Lennie James, English actor, screenwriter, and playwright
- October 13 – Kalpana, Indian film actress (d. 2016)
- October 14
  - Steve Coogan, British comedian and actor
  - Jüri Jaanson, Estonian rower and politician
- October 16 – Kang Kyung-ok, South Korean artist
- October 17 – Aravinda de Silva, Sri Lankan cricketer
- October 18 – Zakir Naik, Indian doctor and Islamic activist
- October 19 – Tracy Griffith, American actress, sushi chef, and painter
- October 20
  - Amos Mansdorf, Israeli tennis player
  - Stefano Pioli, Italian football player and manager
- October 22 – Sumito Estévez, Venezuelan chef
- October 26
  - Aaron Kwok, Hong Kong singer and actor
  - Kelly Rowan, Canadian actress
  - Kenneth Rutherford, New Zealand cricketer
- October 29 – Christy Clark, Canadian politician
- October 30 – Zaza Urushadze, Georgian film director, producer and screenwriter (d. 2019)

=== November ===
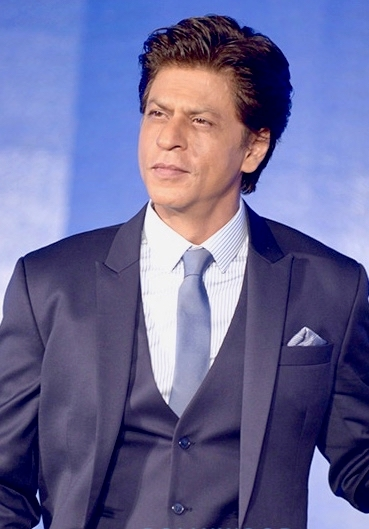
Shah Rukh Khan

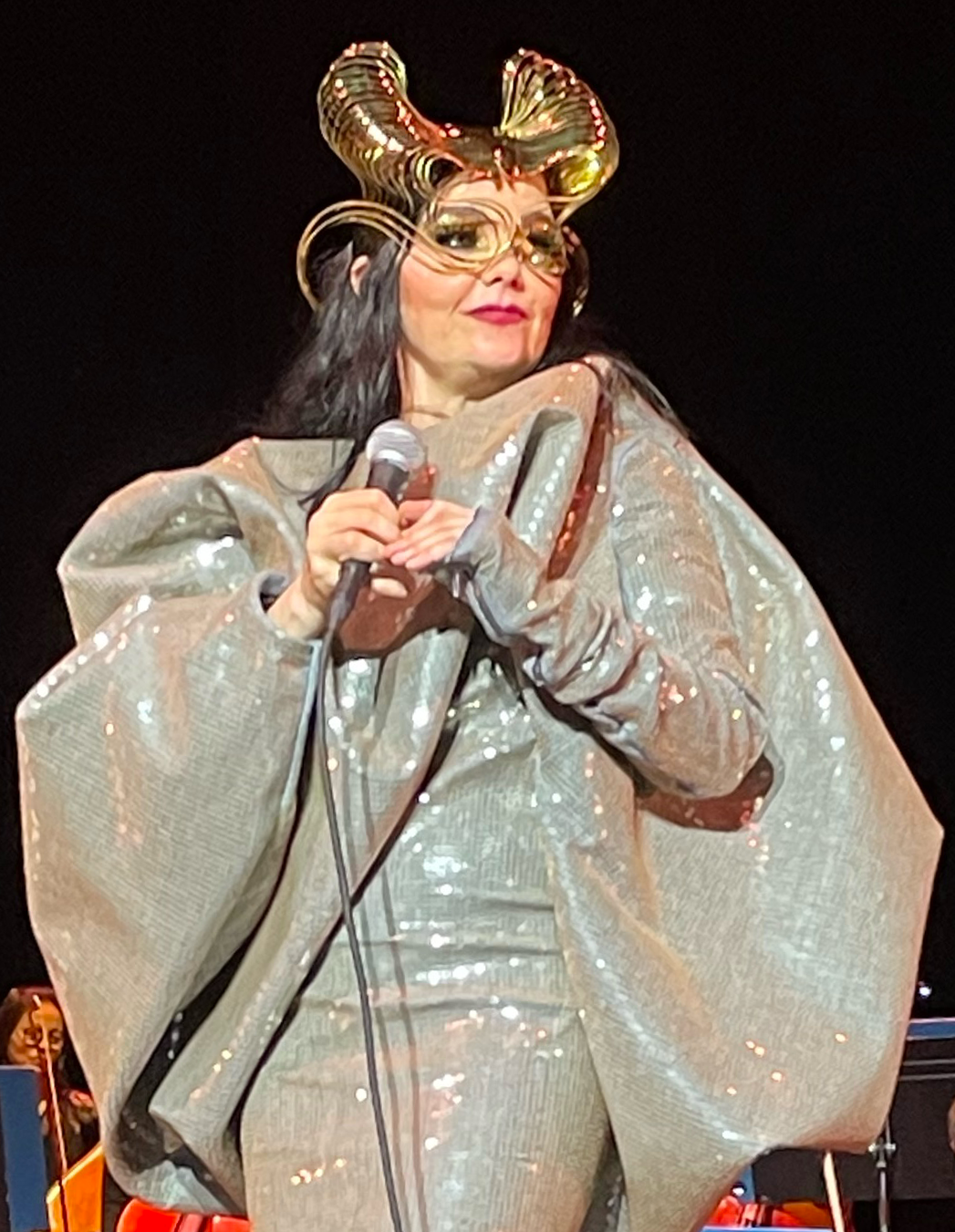
Björk

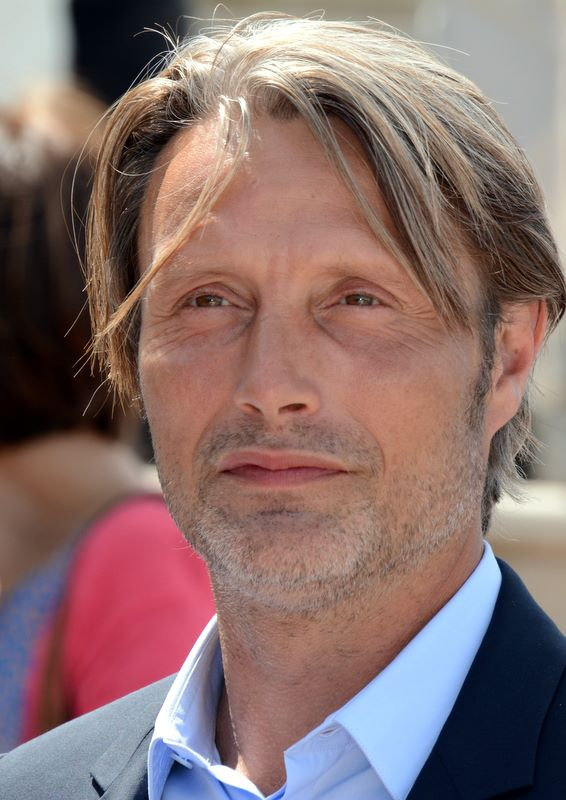
Mads Mikkelsen

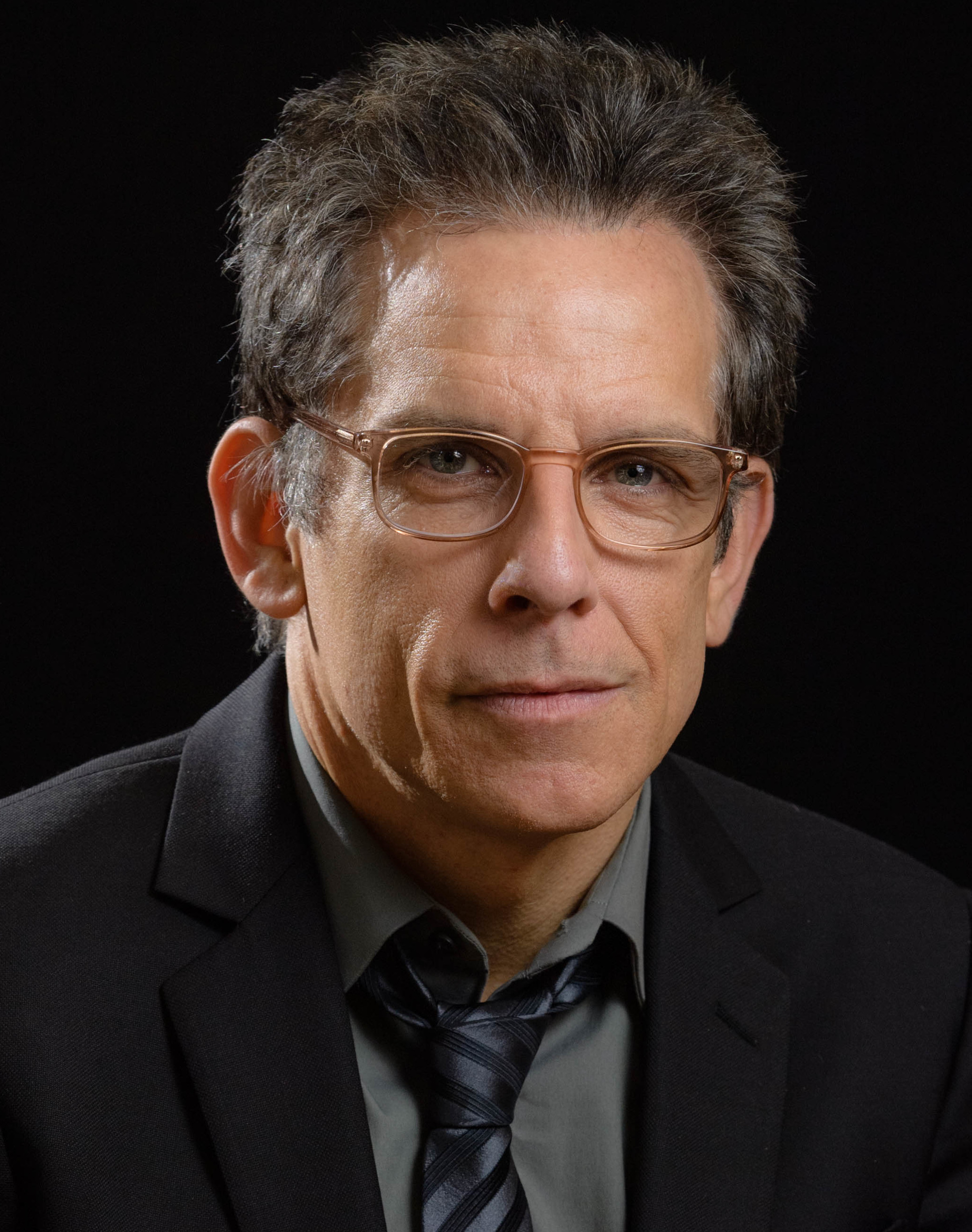
Ben Stiller

- November 2
  - Paweł Adamowicz, Polish politician and lawyer (d. 2019)
  - Shah Rukh Khan, Indian actor, film/television producer and television presenter
- November 4 – Wayne Static, American singer and musician (Static-X) (d. 2014)
- November 7 – Sigrun Wodars, German athlete
- November 8 – Patricia Poleo, Venezuelan journalist
- November 9 – Sir Bryn Terfel, Welsh baritone
- November 10 – Eddie Irvine, Northern Irish racing driver
- November 17 – Pam Bondi, American attorney and politician, 87th U.S. Attorney General
- November 19
  - Paulo Barreto, Brazilian cryptographer
  - Laurent Blanc, French football player and manager
- November 20 – Yoshiki, Japanese rock composer, pianist, and drummer
- November 21
  - Björk, Icelandic singer-songwriter and musician
  - Reggie Lewis, American basketball player (d. 1993)
  - Alexander Siddig, Sudanese-British actor
- November 22 – Mads Mikkelsen, Danish actor
- November 23 – Radion Gataullin, Uzbek-Russian pole-vaulter
- November 24 – Shirley Henderson, Scottish actress
- November 25 – Ana Paula Padrão, Brazilian journalist, chief editor, entrepreneur, writer and television presenter
- November 26 – Scott Adsit, American actor
- November 29
  - Lauren Child, American author
  - Raffaella Reggi, Italian tennis player
- November 30
  - Ben Stiller, American actor, comedian and filmmaker
  - Tashi Tenzing, Indian mountaineer

=== December ===
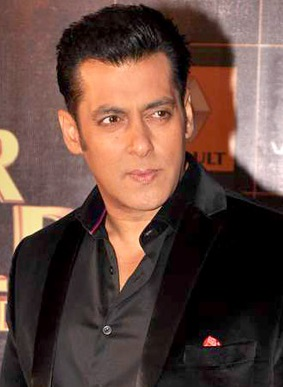
Salman Khan

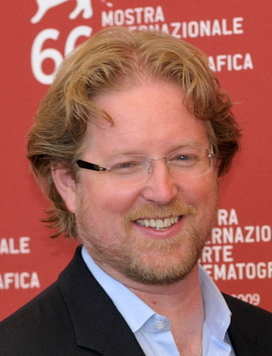
Andrew Stanton

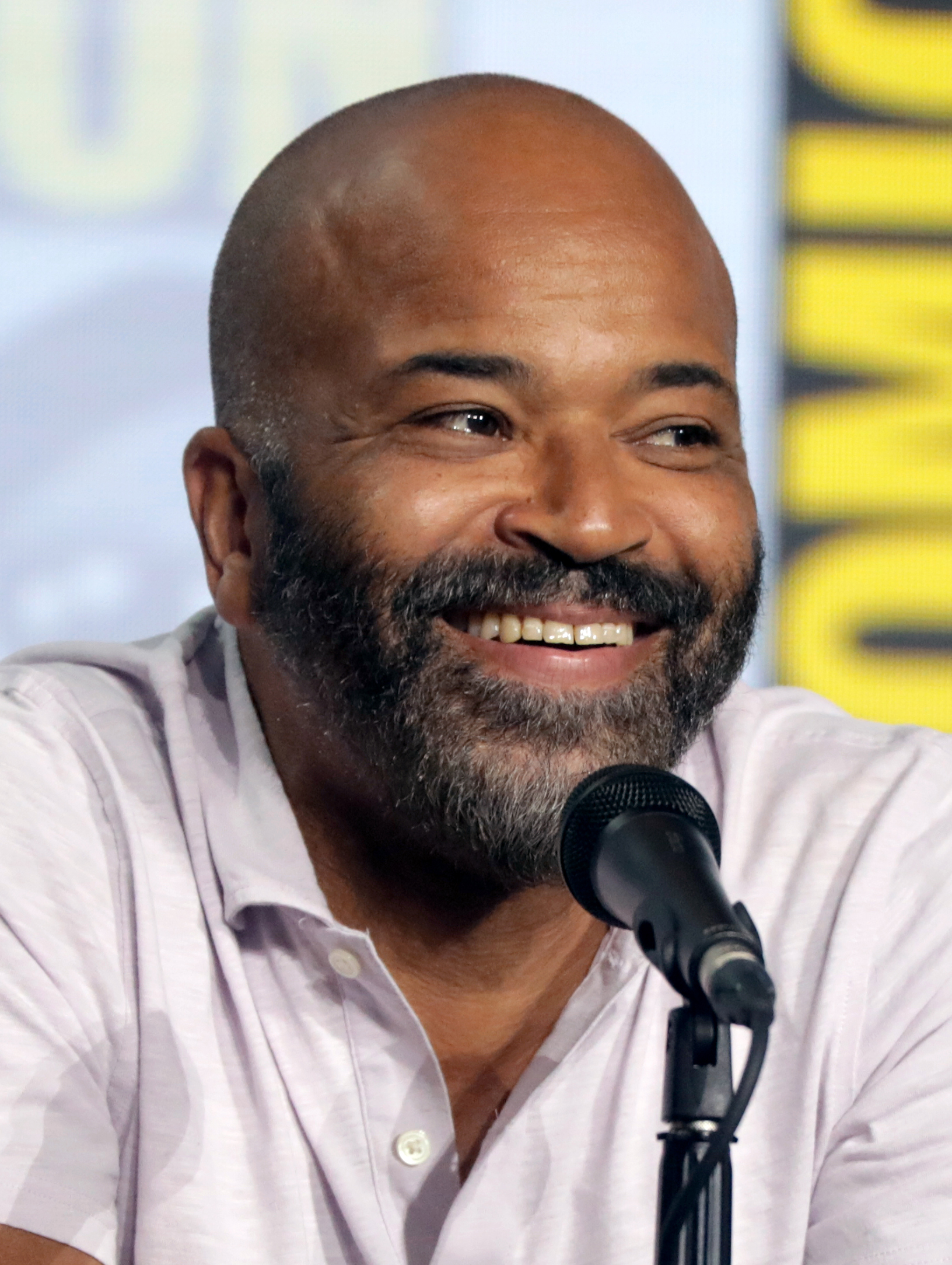
Jeffrey Wright

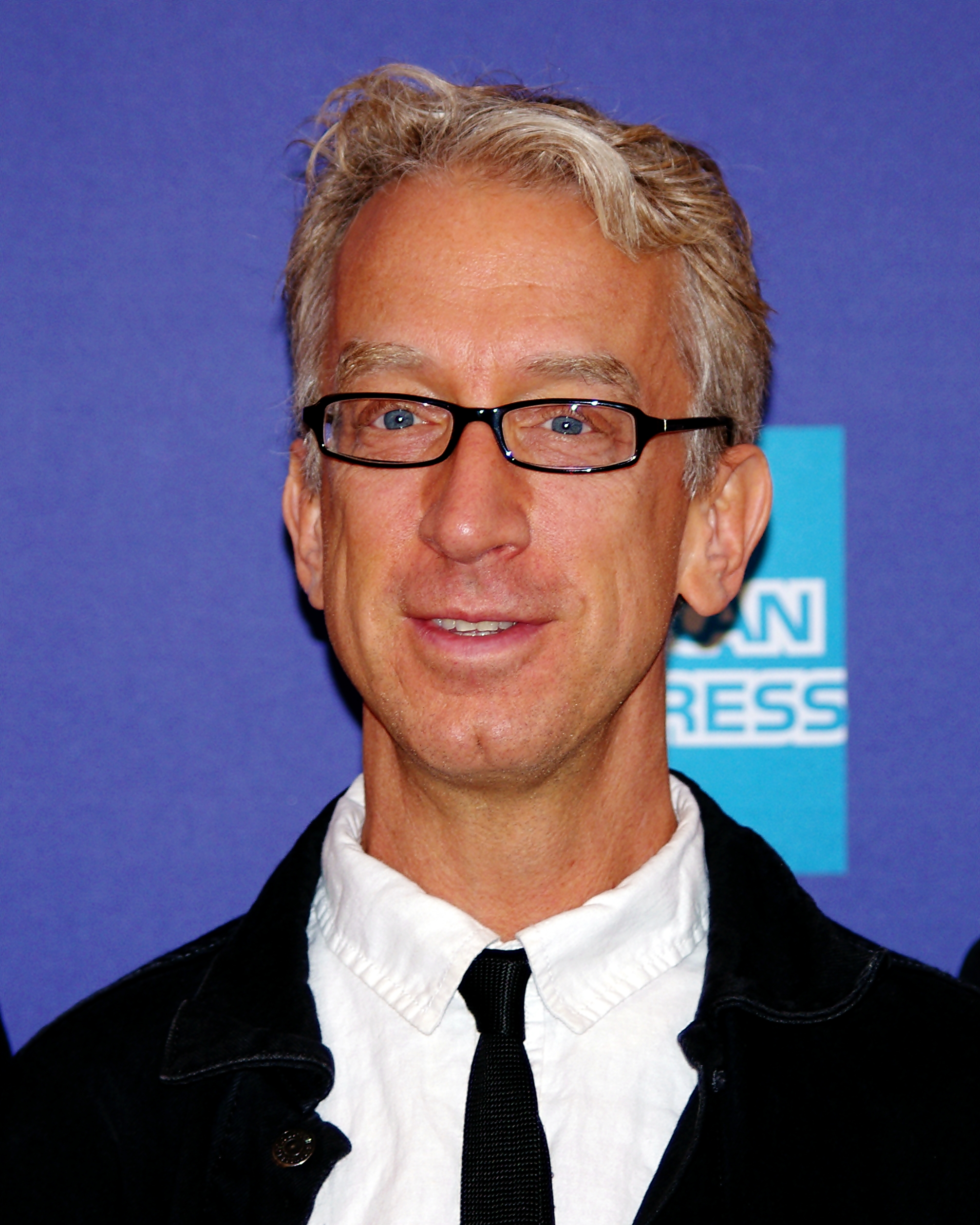
Andy Dick

- December 3
  - Steve Harris, American actor
  - Katarina Witt, German figure skater
  - Andrew Stanton, American animator, storyboard artist, film director, and screenwriter
- December 5 – Johnny Rzeznik, American rock singer and guitarist
- December 7
  - Teruyuki Kagawa, Japanese actor
  - Jeffrey Wright, African-American actor
- December 8 – David Harewood, English actor
- December 10 – Stephanie Morgenstern, Canadian actress
- December 15 – Luis Fabián Artime, Argentine footballer
- December 16 – J. B. Smoove, African-American actor and comedian
- December 18 – John Moshoeu, South African footballer (d. 2015)
- December 19 – Jessica Steen, Canadian actress
- December 21
  - Andy Dick, American actor and comedian
  - Anke Engelke, German comedian, actress and voice-over actress
- December 23 – Andreas Kappes, German cyclist (d. 2018)
- December 27 – Salman Khan, Indian actor, television presenter
- December 30
  - Valentina Legkostupova, Soviet and Russian pop singer, teacher and producer (d. 2020)
  - Robert Rep, Dutch politician
- December 31
  - Nicholas Sparks, American author
  - Gong Li, Chinese actress

== Deaths ==
=== January ===
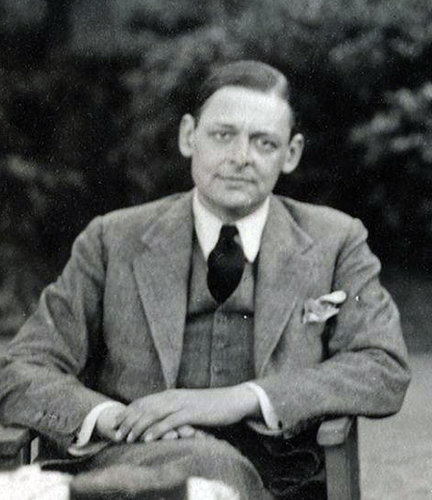
T. S. Eliot

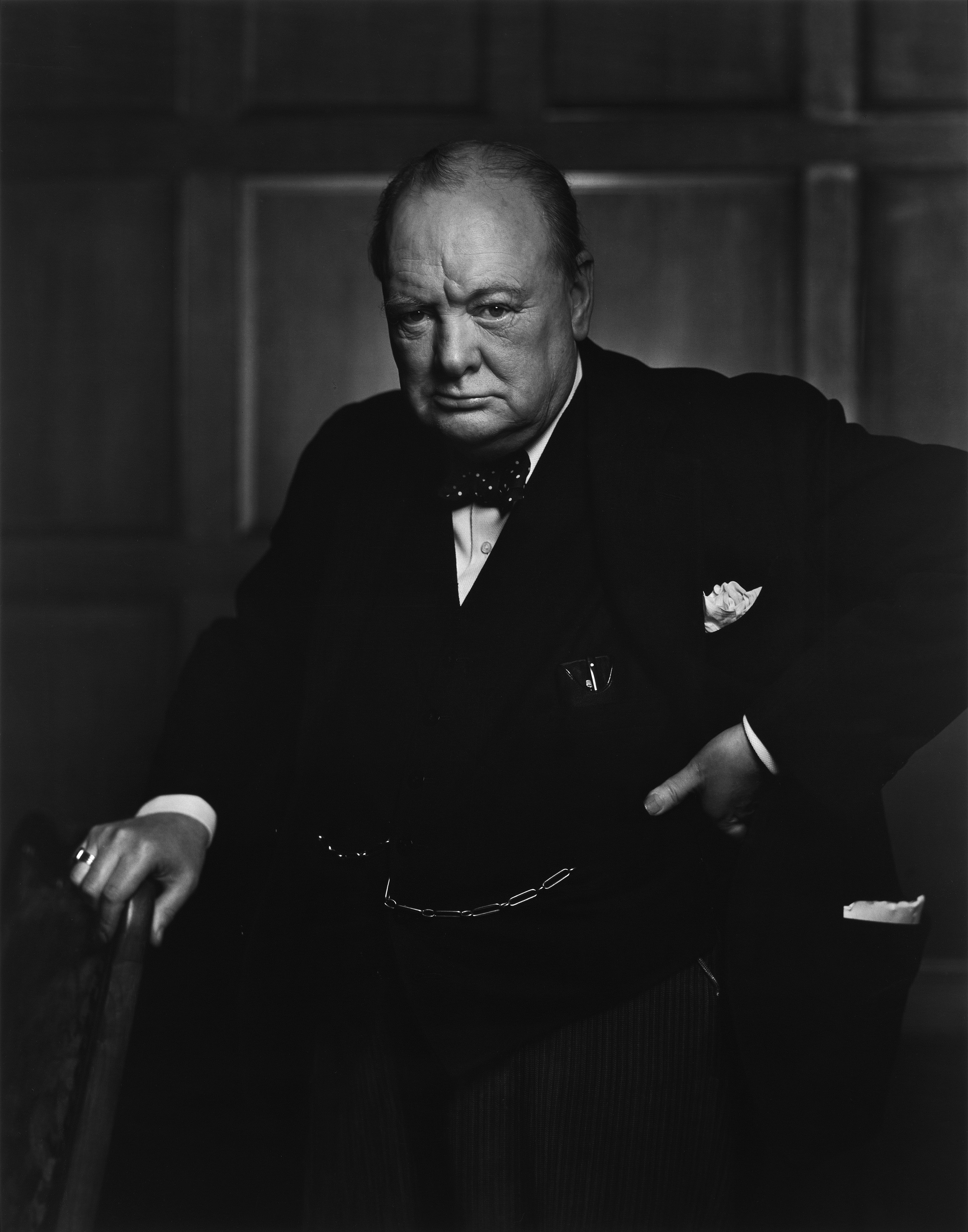
Winston Churchill

- January 4 – T. S. Eliot, American-British poet, Nobel Prize laureate (b. 1888)
- January 10
  - Antonín Bečvář, Czechoslovak astronomer (b. 1901)
  - Frederick Fleet, British sailor and lookout aboard the RMS Titanic (b. 1887)
- January 12 – Lorraine Hansberry, African-American playwright and writer (b. 1930)
- January 14 – Jeanette MacDonald, American actress and singer (b. 1903)
- January 15 – Pierre Ngendandumwe, 4th and 6th Prime Minister of Burundi (assassinated) (b. 1930)
- January 20 – Alan Freed, American disc jockey (b. 1921)
- January 24 – Sir Winston Churchill, British politician and statesman, twice Prime Minister of the United Kingdom, World War II leader, recipient of the Nobel Prize in Literature (b. 1874)
- January 27 – Hassan Ali Mansur, Iranian politician, 69th Prime Minister of Iran (b. 1923)
- January 28
  - Taimur bin Feisal, Sultan of Oman (b. 1886)
  - Tich Freeman, English cricketer (b. 1888)
  - Maxime Weygand, French general (b. 1867)
- January 31 – Konstantin Muraviev, 31st Prime Minister of Bulgaria (b. 1893)

=== February ===
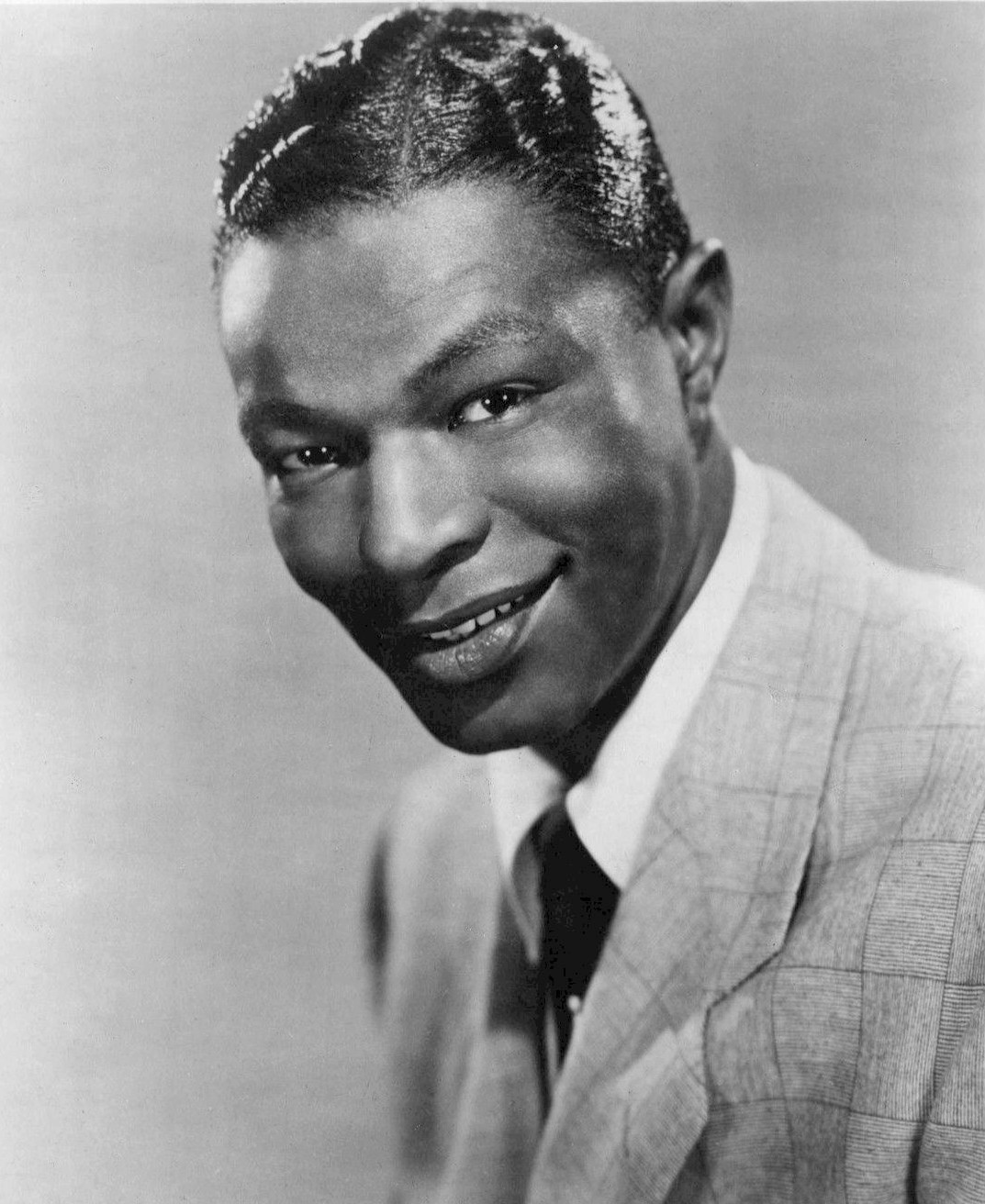
Nat King Cole

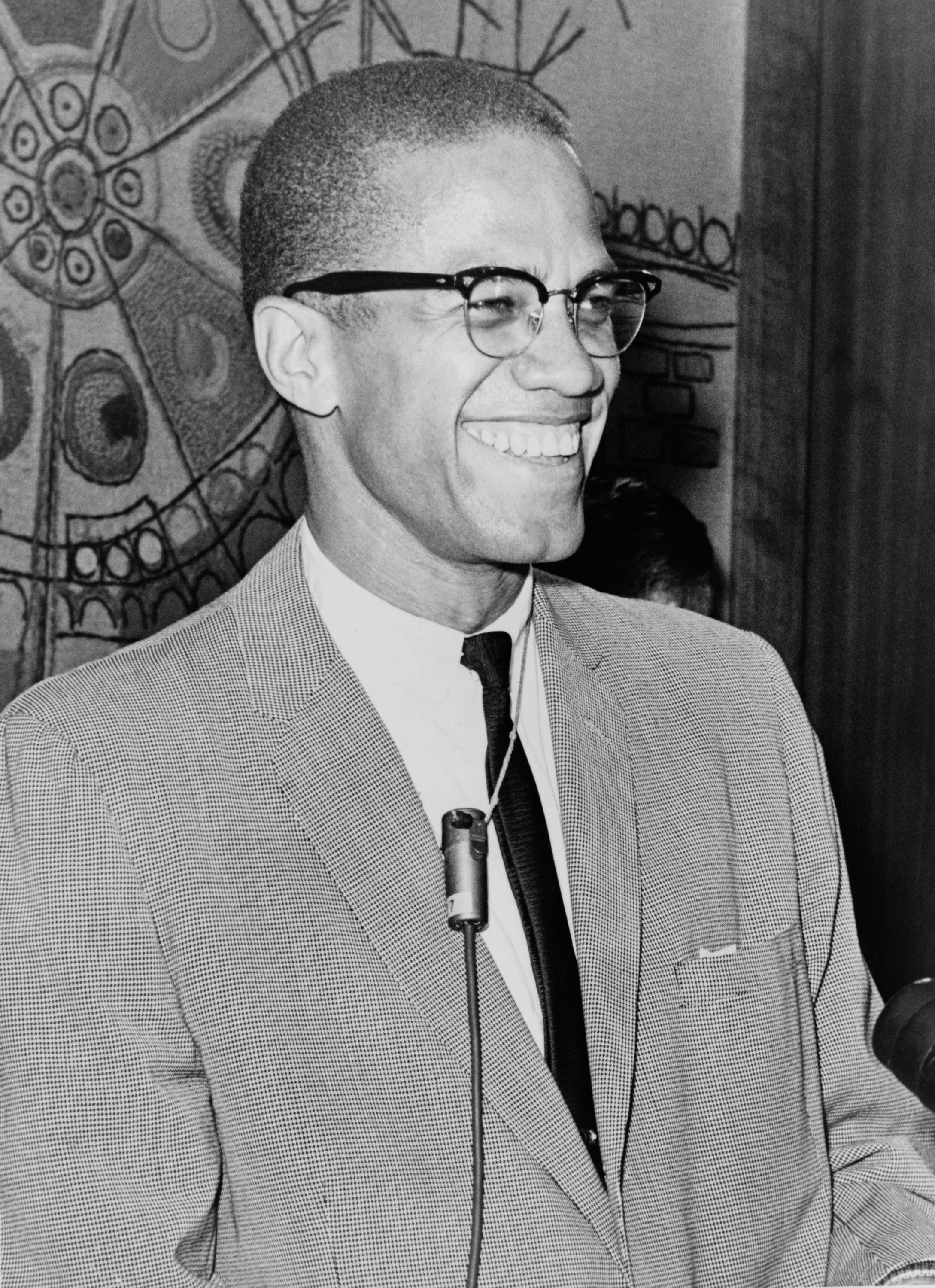
Malcolm X

- February 5 – Irving Bacon, American actor (b. 1893)
- February 6 – Frederick, Prince of Hohenzollern (b. 1891)
- February 7 – Nance O'Neil, American stage and film actress (b. 1874)
- February 9 – Khan Bahadur Ahsanullah, Indian educationist, philosopher, philanthropist, social reformer and spiritualist (b. 1874)
- February 13
  - Humberto Delgado, Portuguese general and opposition politician (b. 1906)
  - William Heard Kilpatrick, American mathematician and philosopher (b. 1871)
- February 14 – Désiré-Émile Inghelbrecht, French composer (b. 1880)
- February 15 – Nat King Cole, American singer and musician (b. 1919)
- February 19
  - Forrest Taylor, American actor (b. 1883)
  - Tom Wilson, American actor (b. 1880)
- February 21 – Malcolm X, American civil rights activist (b. 1925)
- February 22 – Felix Frankfurter, U.S. Supreme Court Justice (b. 1882)
- February 23 – Stan Laurel, British actor (b. 1890)
- February 24 – Takeo Itō, Japanese general (b. 1889)
- February 28 – Adolf Schärf, Austrian politician, 6th President of Austria (b. 1890)

=== March ===
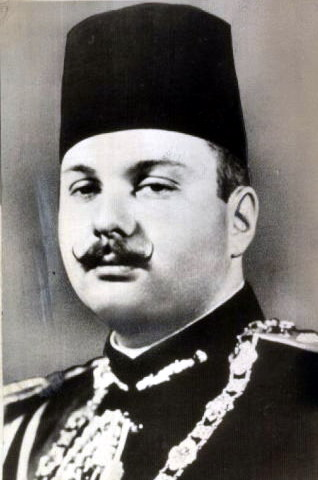
King Farouk of Egypt

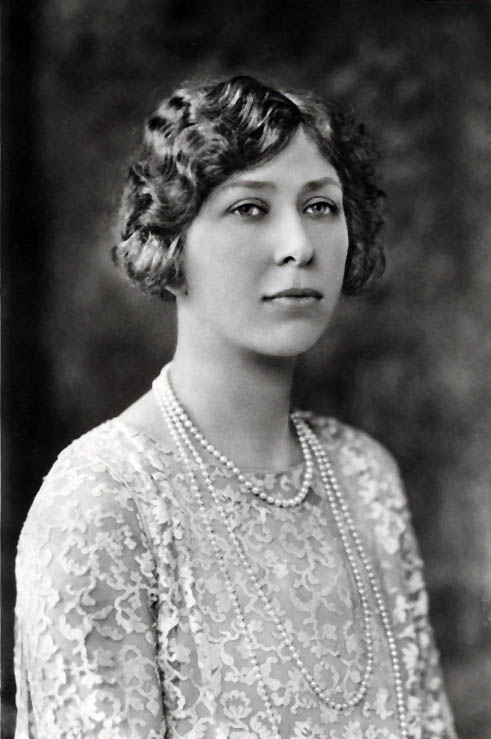
Mary, Princess Royal and Countess of Harewood

- March 2 – Masakazu Kawabe, Japanese general (b. 1886)
- March 5 – Salvador Castaneda Castro, 31st President of El Salvador (b. 1888)
- March 6
  - Margaret Dumont, American actress (b. 1889)
  - Herbert Morrison, British politician (b. 1888)
- March 7 – Louise Mountbatten, queen consort of Sweden as second wife of King Gustaf VI Adolf (b. 1889)
- March 13
  - Corrado Gini, Italian statistician (b. 1884)
  - Vittorio Jano, Italian automobile designer (b. 1891)
  - Fan Noli, Albanian bishop, poet and politician, 13th Prime Minister of Albania (b. 1882)
- March 14 – Marion Jones Farquhar, American tennis champion (b. 1879)
- March 17
  - Nancy Cunard, English writer, heiress and political activist (b. 1896)
  - Amos Alonzo Stagg, American baseball, basketball and football player and coach (b. 1862)
- March 18 – Farouk of Egypt, deposed king (b. 1920)
- March 19 – Gheorghe Gheorghiu-Dej, Romanian communist leader, 47th Prime Minister of Romania (b. 1901)
- March 22 – Fidel Dávila, Spanish general and minister (b. 1878)
- March 23 – Mae Murray, American silent film actress (b. 1885)
- March 25 – Viola Liuzzo, American Unitarian Universalist and civil rights activist (b. 1925)
- March 28
  - Mary, Princess Royal and Countess of Harewood, member of the British royal family (b. 1897)
  - Jack Hoxie, American actor, rodeo performer (b. 1885)
- March 30 – Philip Showalter Hench, American physician, recipient of the Nobel Prize in Physiology or Medicine (b. 1896)

=== April ===
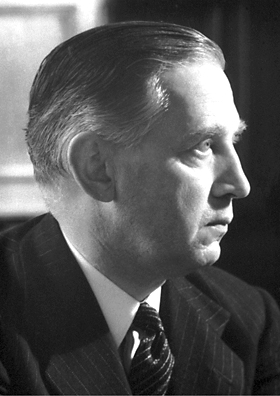
Edward Victor Appleton

- April 3 – Ray Enright, American film director (b. 1896)
- April 9 – Sherman Minton, American politician and Associate Justice of the Supreme Court of the United States (b. 1890)
- April 10
  - Linda Darnell, American actress (b. 1923)
  - La Belle Otero, Spanish actress, dancer and courtesan (b. 1868)
- April 14
  - Leonard Mudie, English actor (b. 1883)
  - Perry Smith (b. 1928) and Richard Hickock (b. 1931), American convicted murderers
- April 16 – Sydney Chaplin, English actor (b. 1885)
- April 18 – Guillermo González Camarena, Mexican inventor (b. 1917)
- April 21
  - Sir Edward Victor Appleton, English physicist, Nobel Prize laureate (b. 1892)
  - Pedro Albizu Campos, advocate of Puerto Rican independence (b. 1891)
- April 23 – George Adamski, Polish-American UFO writer (b. 1891)
- April 24 – Louise Dresser, American actress (b. 1878)
- April 27 – Edward R. Murrow, American journalist (b. 1908)
- April 30 – Helen Chandler, American actress (b. 1906)

=== May ===
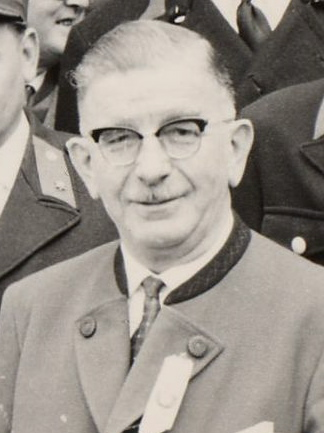
Leopold Figl

- May 1 – Spike Jones, American musician and bandleader (b. 1911)
- May 6 – Oren E. Long, American politician, 10th Governor of Hawai'i (b. 1889)
- May 7
  - Charles Sheeler, American photographer (b. 1883)
  - Alf Bjørnskau Bastiansen, Norwegian priest and politician (b. 1883)
- May 9 – Leopold Figl, 14th Chancellor of Austria and acting President of Austria (b. 1902)
- May 10 – Hubertus van Mook, Dutch Governor-General of the Dutch East Indies (b. 1894)
- May 14 – Frances Perkins, first woman appointed as a United States presidential cabinet member (Labor) (b. 1880)
- May 15 – Yisrael Bar-Yehuda, Zionist activist and Israel politician (b. 1895)
- May 18 – Eli Cohen, Israeli spy (b. 1924)
- May 19 – Maria Dąbrowska, Polish writer (b. 1889)
- May 21 – Sir Geoffrey de Havilland, British aviation pioneer and aircraft company founder (b. 1882)
- May 23
  - Rosina Anselmi, Italian actress (b. 1880)
  - David Smith, American sculptor (b. 1906)
- May 24 – Sonny Boy Williamson, American blues musician (b. 1899)
- May 27 – John Rinehart Blue, American military officer, educator, businessperson, and politician (b. 1905)

=== June ===
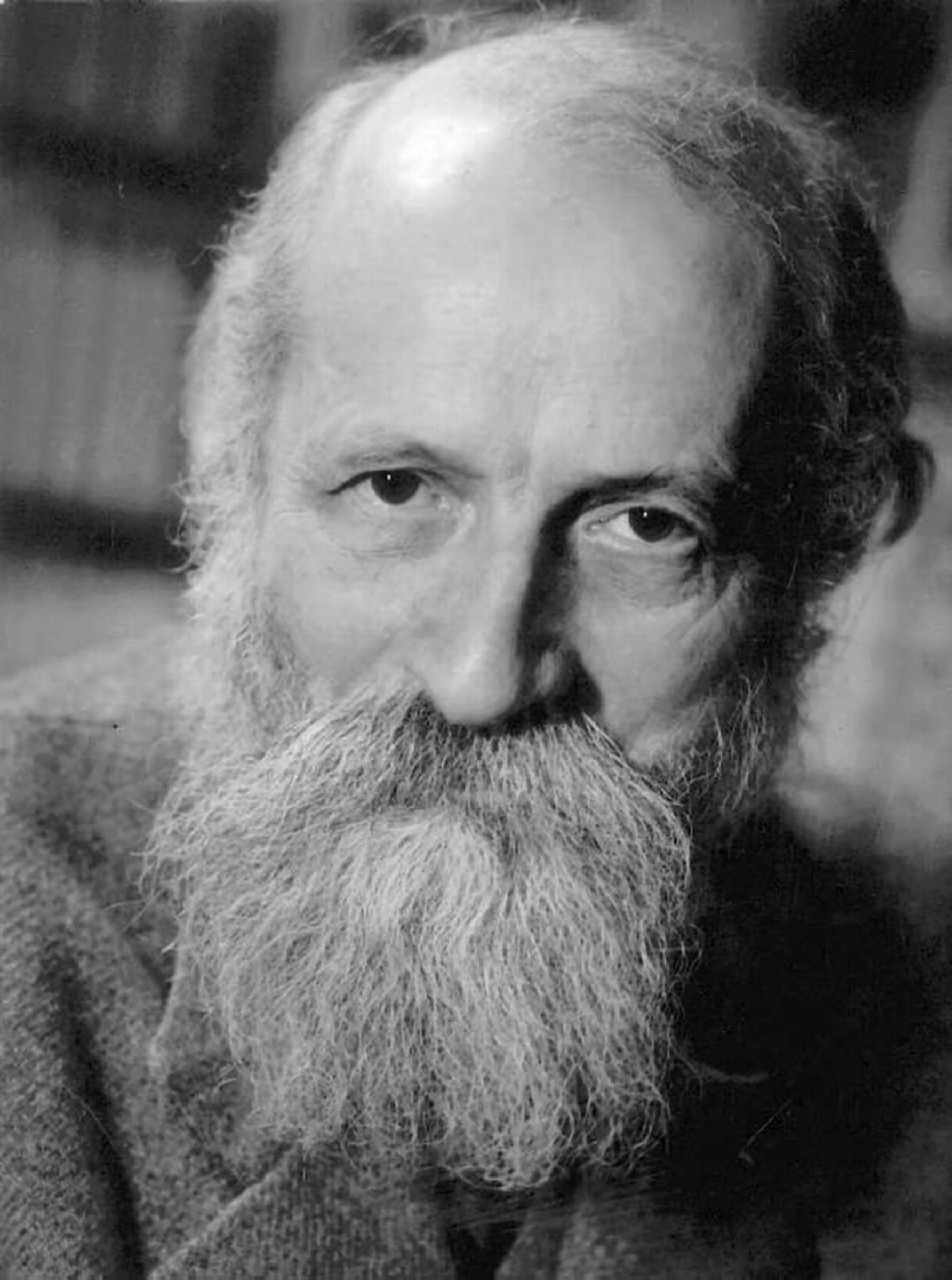
Martin Buber

- June 1 – Curly Lambeau, American football player and coach (b. 1898)
- June 5
  - Eleanor Farjeon, British author of children's literature (b. 1881)
  - Prince Wilhelm, Duke of Södermanland (b. 1884)
- June 7 – Judy Holliday, American actress, comedian, and singer (b. 1921)
- June 11 – José Mendes Cabeçadas, Portuguese navy officer, 94th Prime Minister of Portugal and 9th President of Portugal (b. 1883)
- June 13 – Martin Buber, Austrian-Israeli philosopher (b. 1878)
- June 15 – Steve Cochran, American actor (b. 1917)
- June 19 – James Collip, Canadian biochemist (b. 1892)
- June 20 – Bernard Baruch, American financier and presidential adviser (b. 1870)
- June 22 – David O. Selznick, American film producer (b. 1902)
- June 23 – Mary Boland, American actress (b. 1882)
- June 28
  - Anne-Marcelle Kahn, née Schrameck, first French woman engineer to graduate from l'École nationale supérieure des mines de Saint-Étienne (b. 1896)
  - Red Nichols, American jazz cornettist (b. 1905)
- June 30 – Bessie Barriscale, American actress (b. 1884)

=== July ===
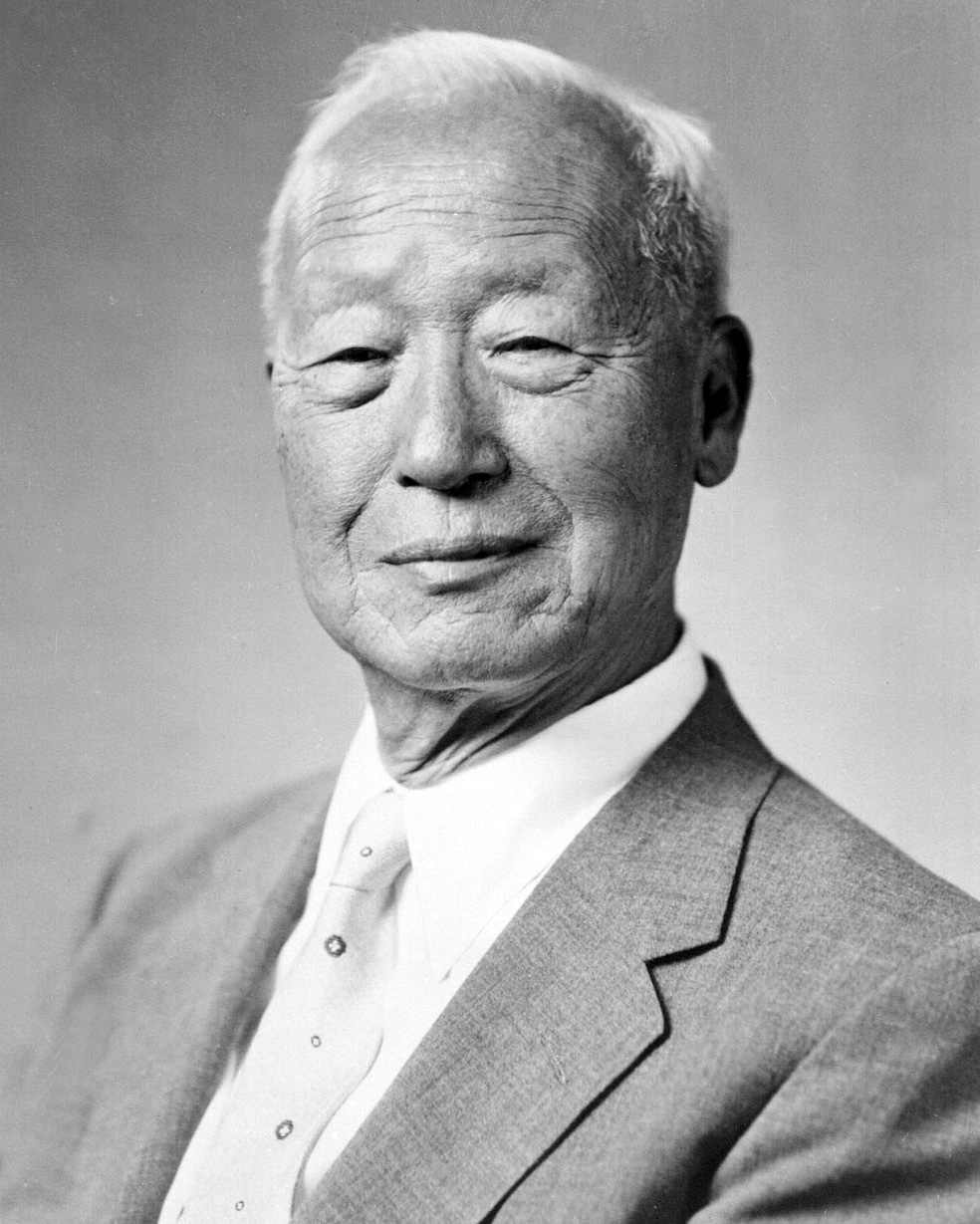
Syngman Rhee

- July 1 – Wally Hammond, English cricketer (b. 1903)
- July 5 – Porfirio Rubirosa, Dominican diplomat, race-car driver and polo player (b. 1909)
- July 7 – Moshe Sharett, 2nd Prime Minister of Israel (b. 1894)
- July 8 – T. S. Stribling, American novelist (b. 1881)
- July 13 – Laureano Gómez, 43rd President of Colombia (b. 1889)
- July 14
  - Adlai Stevenson II, American politician (b. 1900)
  - Max Woosnam, English sportsman (b. 1892)
- July 19
  - Clyde Beatty, American animal trainer (b. 1903)
  - Ingrid Jonker, South African Afrikaans poet (b. 1933)
  - Syngman Rhee, Korean statesman, 1st President of South Korea (b. 1875)
- July 24 – Constance Bennett, American actress (b. 1904)
- July 28 – Rampo Edogawa, Japanese author and critic (b. 1894)
- July 30
  - Pier Ruggero Piccio, Italian World War I fighter ace, air force general (b. 1880)
  - Jun'ichirō Tanizaki, Japanese writer (b. 1886)

=== August ===
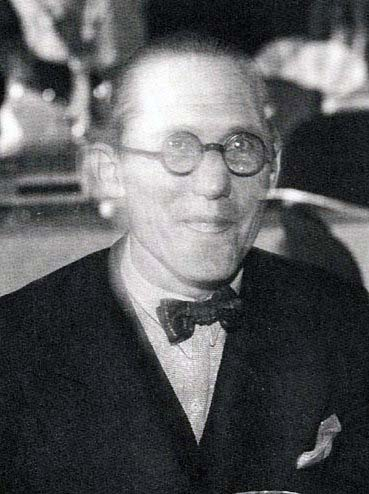
Le Corbusier

- August 1 – John Miller, American Olympic rower - Men's eights (b. 1903)
- August 6
  - Nancy Carroll, American actress (b. 1903)
  - Everett Sloane, American actor (b. 1909)
- August 8 – Shirley Jackson, American author (b. 1916)
- August 9 – Creighton Hale, American actor (b. 1882)
- August 13 – Hayato Ikeda, Japanese politician, 38th Prime Minister of Japan (b. 1899)
- August 25 – Johnny Hayes, American Olympic athlete (b. 1886)
- August 27 – Le Corbusier, Swiss architect (b. 1887)
- August 28
  - Rashid Ali al-Gaylani, Iraqi politician, 9th Prime Minister of Iraq (b. 1892)
  - Giulio Racah, Israeli physicist (b. 1909)

=== September ===
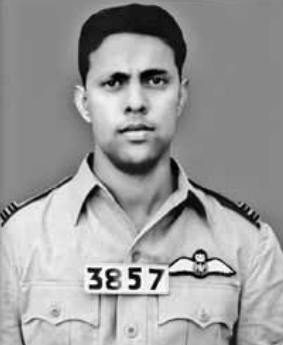
Yunus Hussain

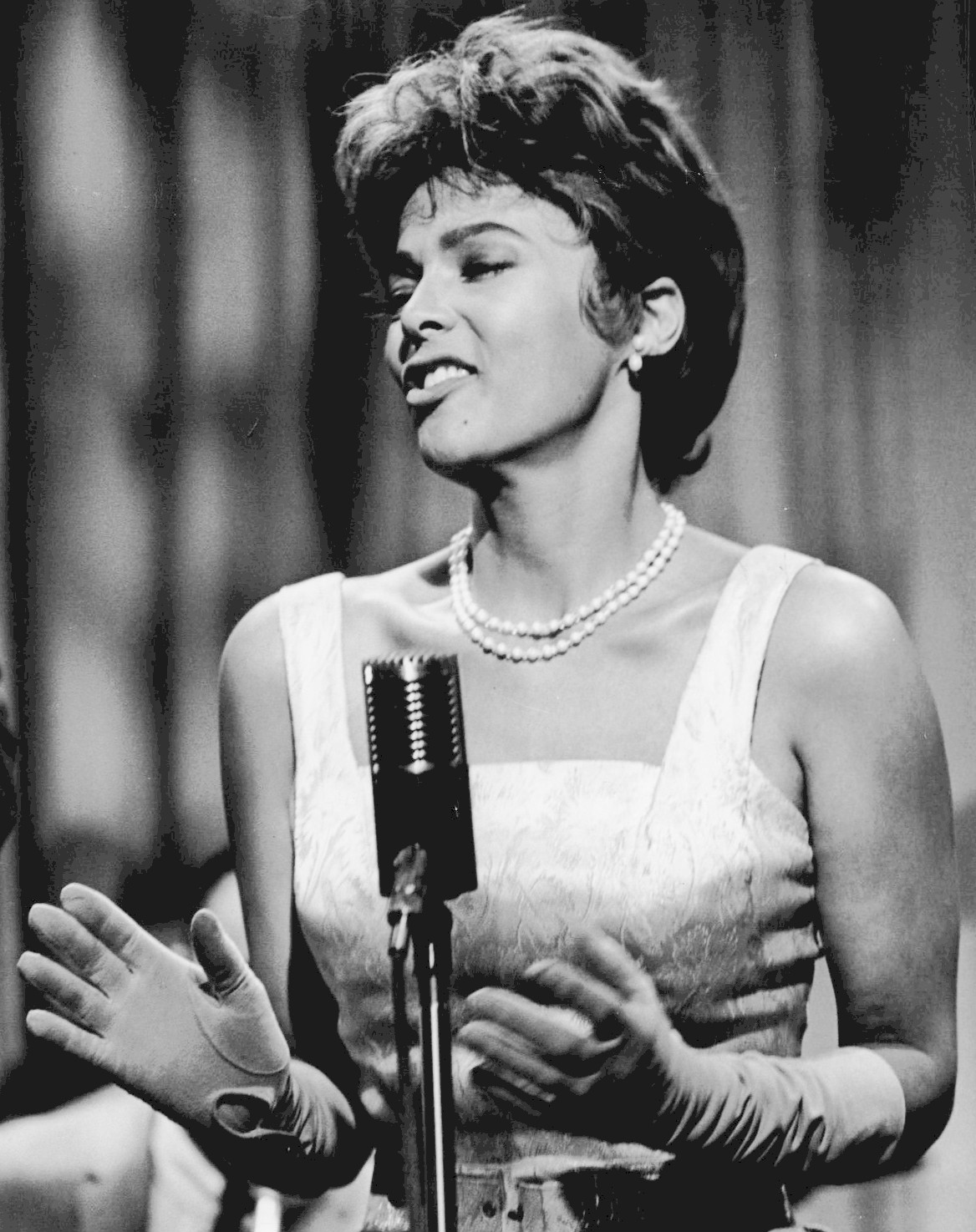
Dorothy Dandridge

- September 4
  - Tommy Hampson, British Olympic athlete (b. 1907)
  - Albert Schweitzer, Alsatian physician and missionary, recipient of the Nobel Peace Prize (b. 1875)
- September 6 – Yunus Hussain, Pakistani fighter pilot (b. 1935)
- September 8
  - Dorothy Dandridge, American actress (b. 1922)
  - Hermann Staudinger, German chemist, Nobel Prize laureate (b. 1881)
- September 12 – Lucian Truscott, American general (b. 1895)
- September 16
  - Ahn Eak-tai, Korean composer and conductor (b. 1906)
  - Fred Quimby, American animated film producer (b. 1886)
- September 17 – Alejandro Casona, Spanish poet and playwright (b. 1903)
- September 22 – Othmar Ammann, Swiss-born American engineer (b. 1879)
- September 27 – Clara Bow, American silent film actress (b. 1905)

=== October ===
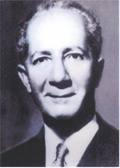
Samir Al-Rifai

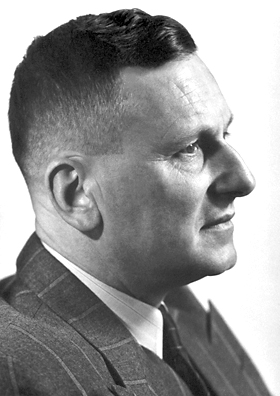
Paul Hermann Müller

- October 1 – Anton Boisen, American founder of the clinical pastoral education movement (b. 1876)
- October 3 – Zachary Scott, American actor (b. 1914)
- October 8 – Thomas B. Costain, Canadian author and journalist (b. 1885)
- October 11
  - Dorothea Lange, American photographer (b. 1895)
  - Walther Stampfli, member of the Swiss Federal Council (b. 1884)
- October 12 – Samir Al-Rifai, 6-time Prime Minister of Jordan (b. 1901)
- October 13 – Paul Hermann Müller, Swiss chemist, recipient of the Nobel Prize in Physiology or Medicine (b. 1899)
- October 14 – Randall Jarrell, American poet (b. 1914)
- October 15 – Abraham Fraenkel, Israeli mathematician and recipient of the Israel Prize (b. 1891)
- October 17 – Bart King, American cricketer (b. 1873)
- October 18
  - Oscar Beregi, Hungarian actor (b. 1876)
  - Henry Travers, English actor (b. 1874)
- October 21
  - Bill Black, American musician and bandleader (b. 1926)
  - Marie McDonald, American actress (b. 1923)
- October 22 – Paul Tillich, German American Christian existentialist philosopher and theologian (b. 1886)
- October 23 – Luis de la Puente Uceda, Peruvian guerrilla leader (b. 1926)
- October 24 – Hans Meerwein, German chemist (b. 1879)
- October 26 – Sylvia Likens, American murder victim (b. 1949)
- October 29 – Miller Anderson, American Olympic diver (b. 1922)
- October 30 – Arthur Schlesinger, Sr., American historian (b. 1888)
- October 31 – Rita Johnson, American actress (b. 1913)

=== November ===
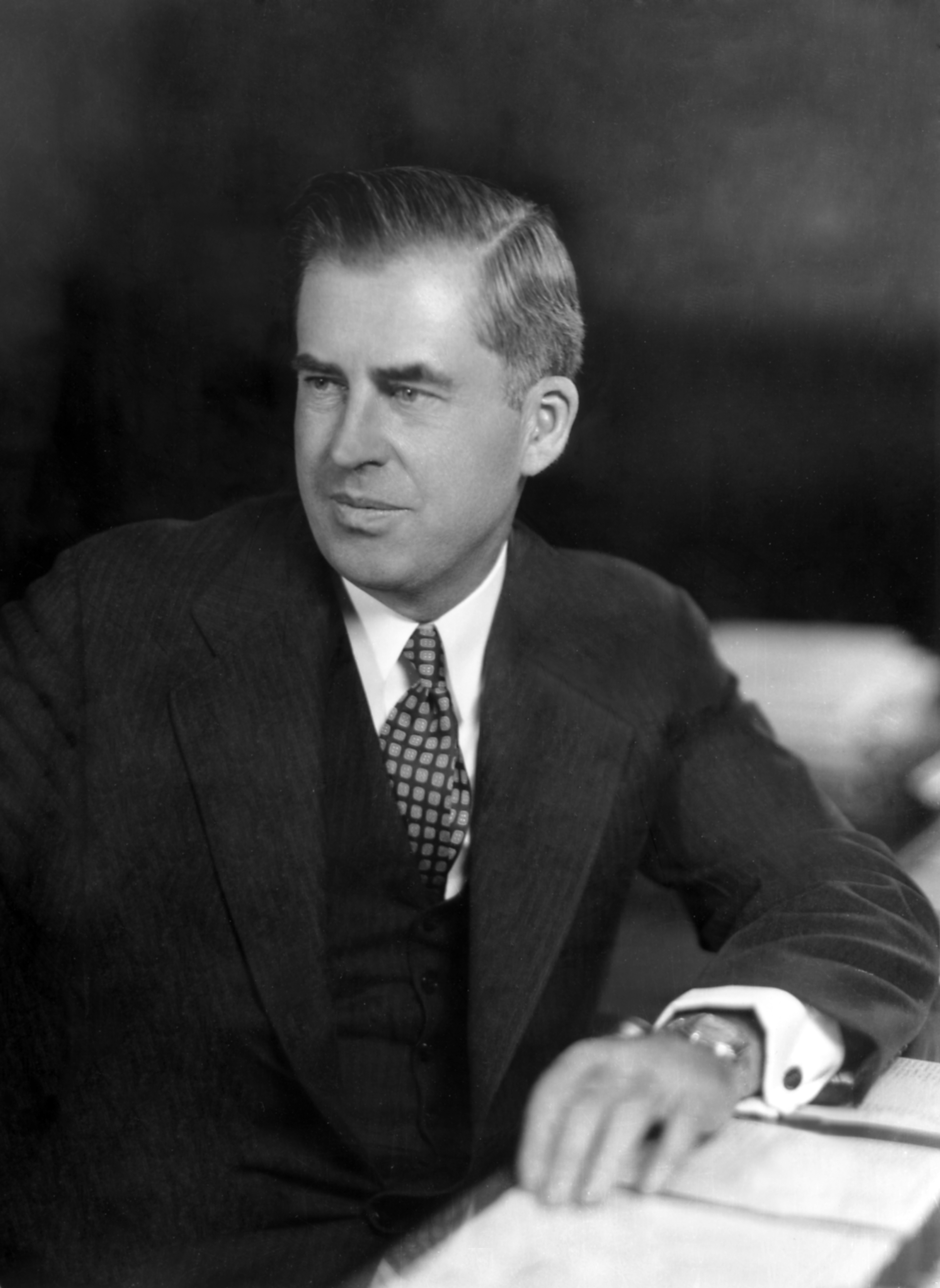
Henry A. Wallace

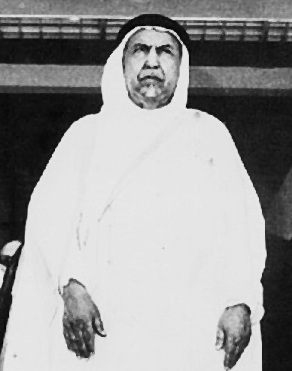
Emir Abdullah III Al-Salim Al-Sabah

- November 2
  - Félix Paiva, 28th President of Paraguay (b. 1877)
  - H.V. Evatt, Australian politician, judge (b. 1894)
- November 6
  - Edgard Varèse, French-born American composer (b. 1883)
  - Clarence Williams, American musician (b. 1893)
- November 8
  - Dorothy Kilgallen, American newspaper columnist and television personality (b. 1913)
  - Emma Gramatica, Italian actress (b. 1874)
  - Mirza Basheer-ud-Din Mahmood Ahmad, second caliph (b. 1889)
- November 12 – Taher Saifuddin, Indian Bohra spiritual leader (b. 1888)
- November 16
  - Harry Blackstone Sr., American magician and illusionist (b. 1885)
  - W. T. Cosgrave, Irish politician, president of the Provisional Government and the Executive Council of the Irish Free State (b. 1880)
- November 18
  - Khalid al-Azm, 5-time Prime Minister of Syria and acting President of Syria (b. 1903)
  - Henry A. Wallace, 33rd Vice President of the United States (b. 1888)
- November 24 – Abdullah III Al-Salim Al-Sabah, Emir of Kuwait (b. 1895)
- November 25 – Dame Myra Hess, English pianist (b. 1890)

=== December ===
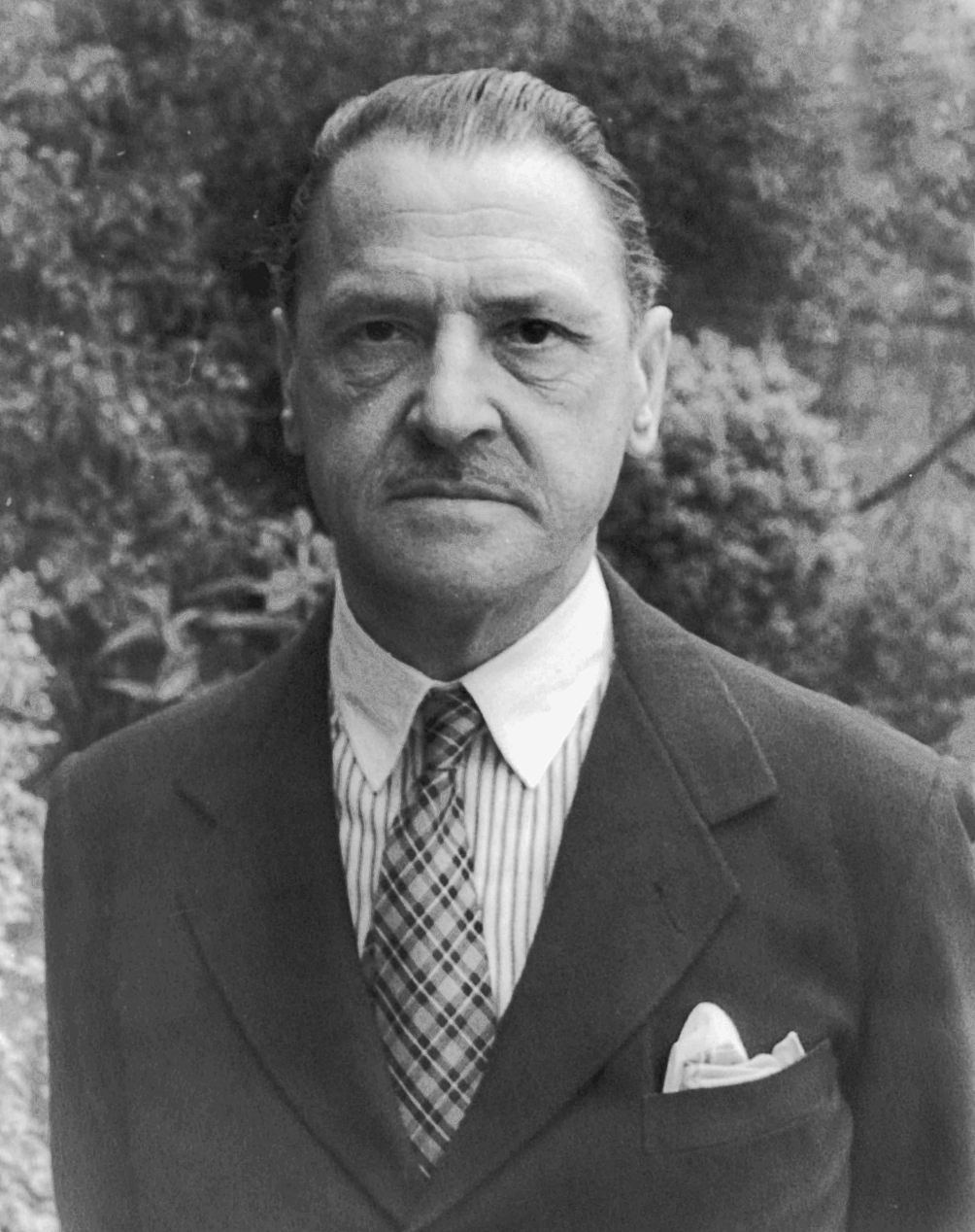
Somerset Maugham

- December 5 – Joseph Erlanger, American physiologist and academic, Nobel Prize laureate (b. 1874)
- December 10 – Henry Cowell, American composer (b. 1897)
- December 11 – George Constantinescu, Romanian scientist (b. 1881)
- December 15 – Joseph Bamina, 8th Prime Minister of Burundi (executed) (b. 1927)
- December 16
  - W. Somerset Maugham, English writer (b. 1874)
  - Tito Schipa, Italian tenor (b. 1889)
  - Queen Sālote Tupou III of Tonga, (b. 1900)
- December 24 – William M. Branham, American minister (b. 1909)
- December 27 – Edgar Ende, German painter (b. 1901)
- December 29 – Kosaku Yamada, Japanese composer and conductor (b. 1886)
- December 31 – Danny Graves, American racing driver (b. 1921)

== Nobel Prizes ==

- Physics – Shin'ichirō Tomonaga, Julian Schwinger, Richard P. Feynman
- Chemistry – Robert Burns Woodward
- Physiology or Medicine – François Jacob, André Michel Lwoff, Jacques Monod
- Literature – Mikhail Sholokhov
- Peace – United Nations Children's Fund (UNICEF)
