= Childhood obesity =

Condition of excess body fat in children

- Specialty: Endocrinology, pediatrics, bariatrics

Childhood obesity is a condition where excess body fat negatively affects a child's health or well-being. As methods to determine body fat directly are difficult, the diagnosis of obesity is often based on BMI. Due to the rising prevalence of obesity in children and its many adverse health effects it is being recognized as a serious public health concern. The term overweight rather than obese is often used when discussing childhood obesity, as it is less stigmatizing, although the term overweight can also refer to a different BMI category. The prevalence of childhood obesity is known to differ by sex and gender.

== Classification ==
BMI for age percentiles for boys 2 to 20 years of age

BMI for age percentiles for girls 2 to 20 years of age

Body mass index (BMI) is acceptable for determining obesity for children two years of age and older. It is determined by the ratio of weight to height.

The normal range for BMI in children vary with age and sex. While a BMI above the 85th percentile is defined as overweight, a BMI greater than or equal to the 95th percentile is defined as obesity by the Centers for Disease Control and Prevention (CDC). Obesity is further categorized as class 1 obesity with BMI at or above the 95th percentile to 119% of the 95th percentile, class 2 obesity with a BMI 120 to 139% of the 95% percentile and class 3 obesity which is 140% or greater of the 95th percentile. The CDC has published tables for determining this in children.

The US Preventive Service Task Force reported that not all children with a high BMI need to lose weight, however. High BMI can identify a possible weight problem, but does not differentiate between fat or lean tissue. Additionally, BMI may mistakenly rule out some children who do have excess adipose tissue. It is therefore beneficial to supplement the reliability of a BMI diagnosis with additional screening tools such as adipose tissue or skin fold measurements.

== Effects on health ==
=== Psychological ===
The first problems to occur in obese children are usually emotional or psychological. Obese children often experience bullying by their peers. Some are harassed or discriminated against by their own family. Stereotypes abound and may lead to low self-esteem and depression.

=== Physical ===
Childhood obesity, however, can also lead to life-threatening conditions including diabetes, high blood pressure, heart disease, sleep problems, cancer, and other disorders. Some of the other disorders would include liver disease, early puberty or menarche, eating disorders such as anorexia and bulimia, skin infections, and asthma and other respiratory problems.

The early physical effects of obesity in adolescence include almost all of the child's organs being affected, gallstones, hepatitis, sleep apnoea and increased intracranial pressure. Overweight children are also more likely to grow up to be overweight adults. Obesity during adolescence has been found to increase mortality rates during adulthood.

A 2008 study has found that children who are obese have carotid arteries which have prematurely aged by as much as thirty years as well as abnormal levels of cholesterol.

System	Condition	System	Condition
Endocrine	Impaired glucose tolerance; Diabetes mellitus; Metabolic syndrome; Hyperandrogenism; Effects on growth and puberty; Nulliparity and nulligravidity	Cardiovascular	Hypertension; Hyperlipidemia; Increased risk of coronary heart disease as an adult
Gastroentestinal	Nonalcoholic fatty liver disease; Cholelithiasis	Respiratory	Obstructive sleep apnea; Obesity hypoventilation syndrome
Musculoskeletal	Slipped capital femoral epiphysis (SCFE); Tibia vara (Blount disease)	Neurological	Idiopathic intracranial hypertension
Psychosocial	Distorted peer relationships; Poor self-esteem; Anxiety; Depression	Skin	Furunculosis; Intertrigo

=== Long-term effects ===
Children who are obese are likely to be obese as adults. Thus, they are more at risk for adult health problems such as heart disease, type 2 diabetes, stroke, several types of cancer, and osteoarthritis. A large population based study showed that adolescents who were overweight or obese had a 2.2 times increased risk of sudden death and a 3.5 times increased risk for death from coronary heart disease or stroke in adulthood as compared to normal BMI peers. Another study showed that those with an elevated BMI in childhood and adulthood were at an elevated risk of certain chronic medical conditions including a 5.4 times increased risk of diabetes, 2.7 times increased risk of hypertension, and 1.8 times increased risk of elevated LDL cholesterol (a cholesterol-based measure of risk of atherosclerosis) in adulthood. However, in children or adolescents with elevated BMI who reduce their BMI to normal levels, these risks are decreased to a similar level as those with normal BMI in childhood and adulthood. One study showed that children who became obese as early as age two were more likely to be obese as adults. According to an article in The New York Times, the health effects of childhood obesity may lead to a reduction in lifespan of two to five years. It is the first time in two centuries that the current generation of children in America may have a shorter lifespan than their parents.

== Causes ==
Childhood obesity can be brought on by a range of factors which often act in combination. "Obesogenic environment" refers to a mixture of environmental factors that are permissive of obesity, especially for those who are genetically predisposed. The greatest risk factor for child obesity is the obesity of both parents. This may be reflected by the family's environment and genetics. Other reasons may also be due to psychological factors and the child's body type.

A 2010 review stated that childhood obesity likely is the result of the interaction of natural selection favouring those with more parsimonious energy metabolism and today's consumerist society with easy access to cheap, energy-dense foods and less energy requirements in daily life.

Factors include the increase in use of technology, increase in snacks and portion size of meals, and the decrease in the physical activity of children. A study found that children who use electronic devices three or more hours a day had between a 17–44% increased risk of being overweight, or a 10–61% increased risk of obesity (Cespedes 2011).

Childhood obesity is common among children from low-income, African American and Hispanic communities. This is mainly because minority children spend less time playing outside the house and staying active. Parents may prefer their children stay inside the home because they fear gang and drug violence and other dangers.

=== Genetics ===
Childhood obesity is often the result of an interplay between many genetic and environmental factors. Polymorphisms in various genes controlling appetite and metabolism predispose individuals to obesity when sufficient calories are present. Over 200 genes affect weight by determining activity level, food preferences, body type, and metabolism. Having two copies of the allele called FTO increases the likelihood of both obesity and diabetes.

As such, obesity is a major feature of a number of rare genetic conditions that often present in childhood:

- Prader–Willi syndrome, with an incidence between 1 in 12,000 and 1 in 15,000 live births, is characterized by hyperphagia and food preoccupations which leads to rapid weight gain in those affected.
- Bardet–Biedl syndrome
- MOMO syndrome
- Leptin receptor mutations
- Congenital leptin deficiency
- Melanocortin receptor mutations

In children with early-onset severe obesity (defined by an onset before ten years of age and body mass index over three standard deviations above normal), 7% harbor a single locus mutation.

One study found that 80% of the offspring of two obese parents were obese, in contrast to less than 10% of the offspring of two parents who were of normal weight. The percentage of obesity that can be attributed to genetics varies from 6% to 85% depending on the population examined.

=== Family practices ===
In the recent decades, family practices have significantly changed, and several of these practices greatly contribute to childhood obesity:

- With a decreasing number of mothers who breast-feed, more infants become obese children as they grow up and are reared on infant formula instead.
- Fewer children go outside and engage in active play as technology, such as television and video games, keeps children indoors.
- Rather than walking or biking to a bus-stop or directly to school, more school-age children are driven to school by their parents, reducing physical activity.
- As family sizes decrease, the children's pester power, their ability to force adults to do what they want, increases. This ability enables them to have easier access to calorie-packed foods, such as candy and soda drinks.
- The social context around family meal-time plays a role in rates of childhood obesity.

=== Social policies ===
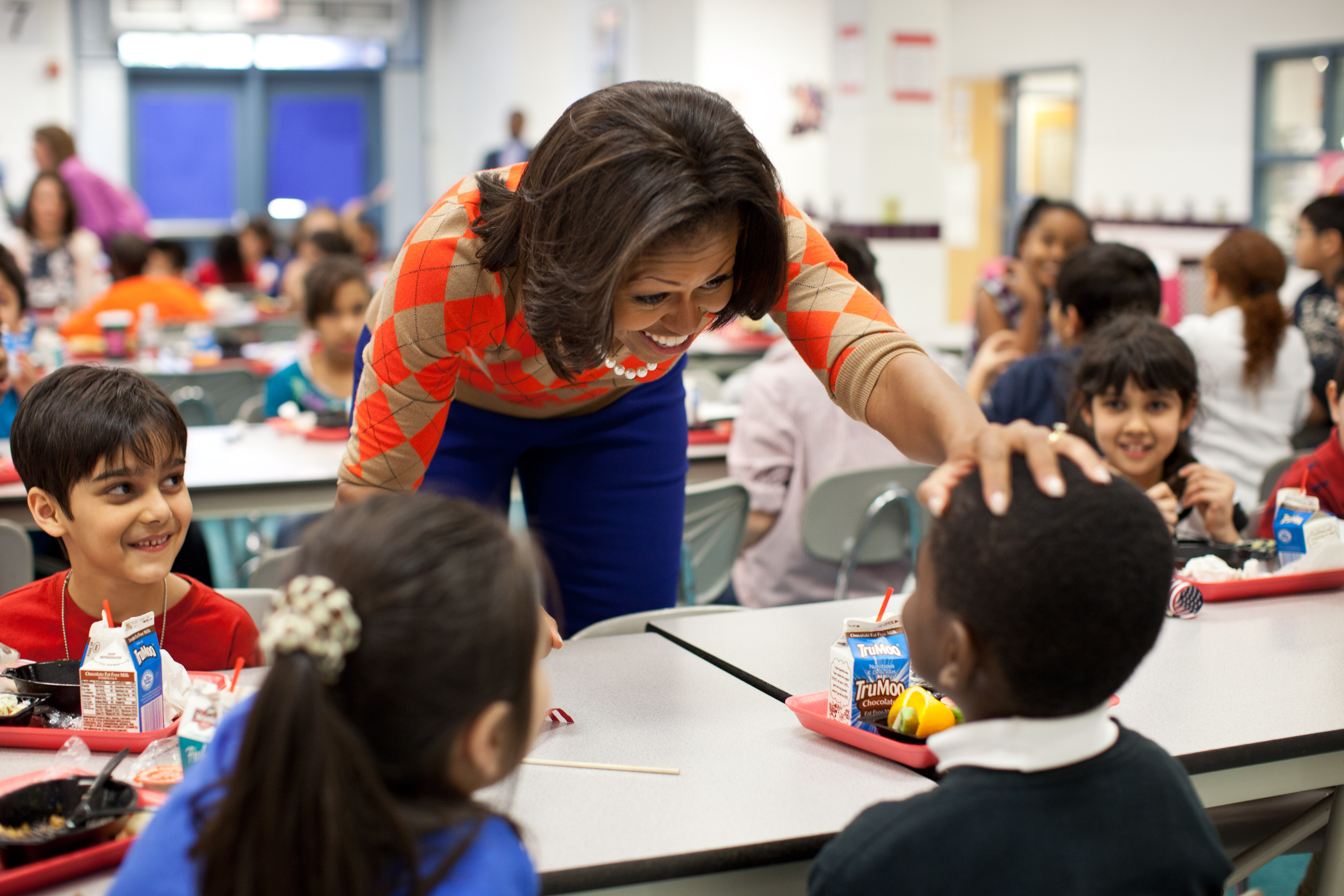
Former First Lady Michelle Obama with students in Virginia sampling healthy meals being introduced by the United States Department of Agriculture

Different communities and nations have adopted varying social practices and policies that are either beneficial or detrimental to children's physical health. These social factors include:

- the quality of school lunches
- the emphasis of schools on physical activity
- access to vending machines and fast-food restaurants
- prevalence of and access to parks, bike paths, and sidewalks
- government subsidies for corn oil and sugar
- advertising of fast-food restaurants and candy
- prices of healthy and unhealthy foods
- access to fresh, healthy, and affordable food

==== Advertising ====
Advertising of unhealthy foods to children increases their consumption of the product and positive attitudes (liking or wanting to buy) about the advertised product. Children's critical reasoning (the ability to understand what an advertisement is and the aim of advertising to buy the product) is not protective against the impact of advertising, and does not appear to be fully developed during adolescence. In some nations, advertising of candy, cereal, and fast-food restaurants is illegal or limited on children's television channels. The media defends itself by blaming the parents for yielding to their children's demands for unhealthy foods.

=== Socioeconomic status ===
It is much more common for young people who come from a racial or ethnic minority, or for those who have a lower socioeconomic status, to be overweight and to engage in less healthy behaviors and sedentary activities.

== Prevention ==
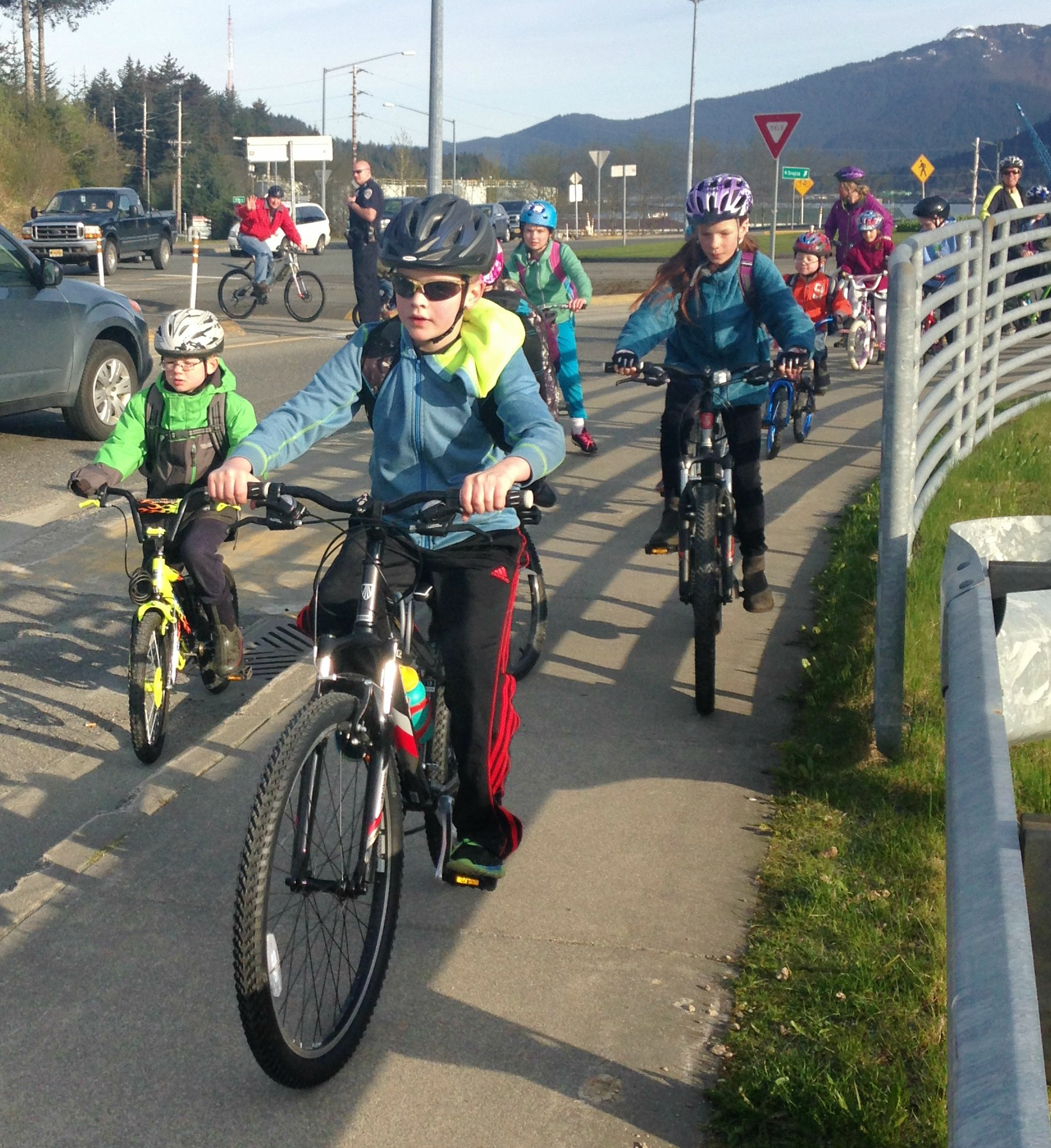
Gastineau Elementary Bike to School Day

Schools play a large role in preventing childhood obesity by providing a safe and supporting environment with policies and practices that support healthy behaviors. At home, parents can help prevent their children from becoming overweight by changing the way the family eats and exercises together. The best way children learn is by example, so parents should lead by example by living a healthy lifestyle. Screening for obesity is recommended in those over the age of six. Both physical activity and diet can help to reduce the risk of obesity in children from 0 to 5 years old; meanwhile, exclusive physical activity can reduce the risk of obesity for children aged from 6 to 12 years old, and adolescents aged from 13 to 18 years old. The implementation of strategies to improve childcare services such as preschools, nurseries, daycare, and kindergarten on healthy eating, physical activity, and obesity prevention shows little effect on a child's diet, physical activity, and weight status.

=== Maternal body mass index ===
Maternal body mass index (BMI) is an important predictor of childhood obesity. Mothers with pre-pregnancy obesity, as defined by BMI ≥30 kg/m^{2}, are known to have children that have higher growth rates and more likely to have obesity.

=== Dietary ===
The effects of eating habits on childhood obesity are difficult to determine. A three-year randomized controlled study of 1,704 third-grade children which provided two healthy meals a day in combination with an exercise program and dietary counselling failed to show a significant reduction in percentage body fat when compared to a control group. This was partly due to the fact that even though the children believed they were eating less, their actual calorie consumption did not decrease with the intervention. At the same time observed energy expenditure remained similar between the groups. This occurred even though dietary fat intake decreased from 34% to 27%. A second study of 5,106 children showed similar results. Even though the children ate an improved diet there was no effect found on BMI. Why these studies did not bring about the desired effect of curbing childhood obesity has been attributed to the interventions being insufficient. Changes were made primarily in the school environment while it is felt that they must occur in the home, the community, and the school simultaneously to have a significant effect.

A Cochrane review of a lower fat diet in children (30% or less of total energy) to prevent obesity found the existing evidence of very low to moderate quality, and firm conclusions could not be made.

Calorie-rich drinks and foods are readily available to children. Consumption of sugar-laden soft drinks may contribute to childhood obesity. In a study of 548 children over a 19-month period the likelihood of obesity increased 1.6 times for every additional soft drink consumed per day.

Calorie-dense, prepared snacks are available in many locations frequented by children. As childhood obesity has become more prevalent, snack vending machines in school settings have been reduced by law in a small number of localities. Some research suggests that the increase in availability of junk foods in schools can account for about one-fifth of the increase in average BMI among adolescents over the last decade. Eating at fast food restaurants is very common among young people, with 75% of 7th to 12th grade students consuming fast food in a given week. The fast food industry is also at fault for the rise in childhood obesity. This industry spends about $4.2 billion on advertisements aimed at young children. McDonald's alone has thirteen websites that are viewed by 365,000 children and 294,000 teenagers each month. In addition, fast food restaurants give out toys in children's meals, which helps to entice children to buy the fast food. According to a 2010 report, 40% of children aged 2 to 11 asked their parents to take them to McDonald's at least once a week, and 15% of preschoolers asked to go every day. To make matters worse, out of 3000 combinations created from popular items on children's menus at fast food restaurants, only 13 meet the recommended nutritional guidelines for young children. Some literature has found a relationship between fast food consumption and obesity, including a study which found that fast food restaurants being located near schools increases the risk of obesity among the student population.

Whole milk consumption verses 2% milk consumption in children of one to two years of age had no effect on weight, height, or body fat percentage. Therefore, whole milk continues to be recommended for this age group. However, the trend of substituting sweetened drinks for milk has been found to lead to excess weight gain.

=== Legal ===
Some jurisdictions use laws and regulations in an effort to steer children and parents towards making healthier food choices. Two examples are calorie count laws and banning soft drinks from sale at vending machines in schools. In 2017 the Obesity Health Alliance called on the United Kingdom government which would be formed after that year's general election to take measures to reduce childhood obesity, for example by banning advertisements for unhealthy foods before 9:00 pm and banning sports sponsorship by manufacturers of unhealthy foods. The failure of Theresa May's then incumbent government to cut sugar, fat and salt content in foods was criticised by health groups. Health experts, the health select committee and campaigners described Conservative plans over childhood obesity as "weak" and "watered down".

=== Physical activity ===
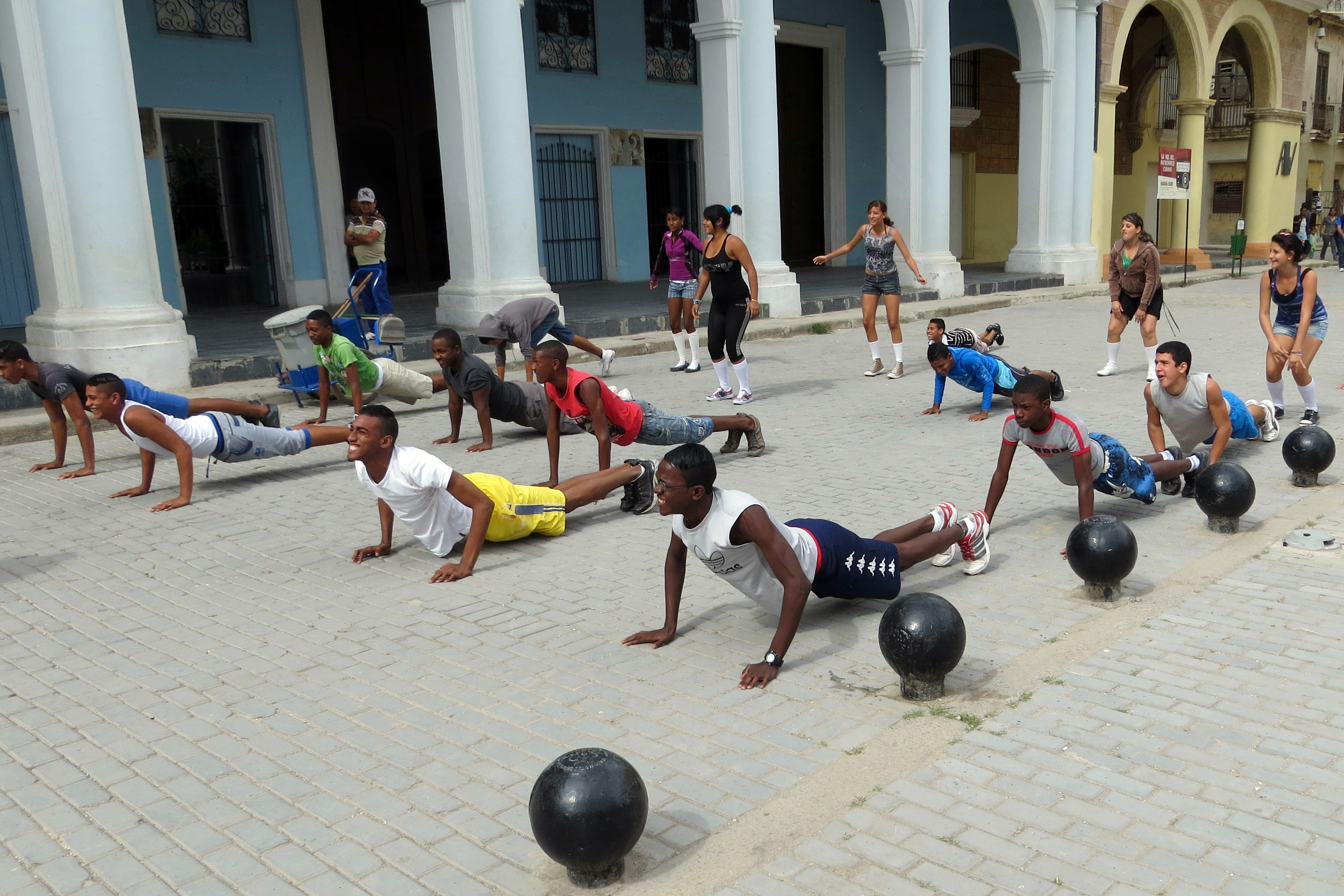
Secondary students in Havana, Cuba, during a physical education class

Physical inactivity of children has also shown to be a serious cause, and children who fail to engage in regular physical activity are at greater risk of obesity. Researchers studied the physical activity of 133 children over a three-week period using an accelerometer to measure each child's level of physical activity. They discovered the obese children were 35% less active on school days and 65% less active on weekends compared to non-obese children.

Physical inactivity as a child could result in physical inactivity as an adult. In a fitness survey of 6,000 adults, researchers discovered that 25% of those who were considered active at ages 14 to 19 were also active adults, compared to 2% of those who were inactive at ages 14 to 19, who were now said to be active adults. Staying physically inactive leaves unused energy in the body, most of which is stored as fat. Researchers studied 16 men over a 14-day period and fed them 50% more of their energy required every day through fats and carbohydrates. They discovered that carbohydrate overfeeding produced 75–85% excess energy being stored as body fat and fat overfeeding produced 90–95% storage of excess energy as body fat.

Many children fail to exercise because they spend long periods of time engaging in sedentary activities such as computer usage, playing video games or watching television. Technology usage may lead to reduced physical activity and is a risk factor for obesity; recreational screen time of 2 hours or more per day is associated with an increased risk of obesity. Adolescents were also 21.5% more likely to be overweight when watching 4+ hours of TV per day, 4.5% more likely to be overweight when using a computer one or more hours per day, and unaffected by potential weight gain from playing video games. A randomized trial showed that reducing TV viewing and computer use can decrease age-adjusted BMI; however reduced calorie intake was thought to be the greatest contributor to the BMI decrease.

Childhood inactivity is linked to obesity in the United States with more children being overweight at younger ages. In a 2009 preschool study 89% of a preschooler's day was found to be sedentary while the same study also found that even when outside, 56 percent of activities were still sedentary. One factor believed to contribute to the lack of activity found was little teacher motivation, but when toys, such as balls were made available, the children were more likely to play.

=== Home environment ===
Poverty, especially in children less than 2 years old, food insecurity and adverse childhood experiences all increase the risk of childhood obesity.

Children's food choices are influenced by family meals. In children and young adults aged 11–21, those who had more meals with their family also had greater intake of vegetables, fruits and dairy. The results of a survey in the UK suggest that children raised by their grandparents are more likely to be obese as adults than those raised by their parents. An American study released in 2011 found the more mothers work the more children are more likely to be overweight or obese.

=== Developmental factors ===
Various developmental factors may affect rates of obesity. Breastfeeding, for example, may protect against obesity in later life with the duration of breastfeeding inversely associated with the risk of being overweight later on. A child's body growth pattern may influence the tendency to gain weight. Researchers measured the standard deviation (SD [weight and length]) scores in a cohort study of 848 babies. They found that infants who had an SD score above 0.67 had catch up growth (they were less likely to be overweight) compared to infants who had less than a 0.67 SD score (they were more likely to gain weight). Additionally, breastfeeding for less than six months, compared to six months or more, has been shown to result in a higher growth rate and higher BMI at 18, 36, and 72 months of age.

A child's weight may be influenced when he/she is only an infant. Researchers also did a cohort study on 19,397 babies from their birth until age seven and discovered that high-weight babies at four months were 1.38 times more likely to be overweight at seven years old compared to normal-weight babies. High-weight babies at the age of one were 1.17 times more likely to be overweight at age seven compared to normal-weight babies.

=== Medical illness ===
Cushing's syndrome (a condition in which the body contains excess amounts of cortisol) may also influence childhood obesity. Researchers analyzed two isoforms (proteins that have the same purpose as other proteins, but are programmed by different genes) in the cells of 16 adults undergoing abdominal surgery. They discovered that one type of isoform created oxo-reductase activity (the alteration of cortisone to cortisol) and this activity increased 127.5 pmol mg sup when the other type of isoform was treated with cortisol and insulin. The activity of the cortisol and insulin can possibly activate Cushing's syndrome.

Hypothyroidism is a hormonal cause of obesity, but it does not significantly affect obese people who have it more than obese people who do not have it. In a comparison of 108 obese patients with hypothyroidism to 131 obese patients without hypothyroidism, researchers discovered that those with hypothyroidism had only 0.077 points more on the caloric intake scale than did those without hypothyroidism.

=== Psychological factors ===
Researchers surveyed 1,520 children, ages 9–10, with a four-year follow up and discovered a positive correlation between obesity and low self-esteem in the four-year follow up. They also discovered that decreased self-esteem led to 19% of obese children feeling sad, 48% of them feeling bored, and 21% of them feeling nervous. In comparison, 8% of normal weight children felt sad, 42% of them felt bored, and 12% of them felt nervous.

Stress can influence a child's eating habits. Researchers tested the stress inventory of 28 college females and discovered that those who were binge eating had a mean of 29.65 points on the perceived stress scale, compared to the control group who had a mean of 15.19 points. This evidence may demonstrate a link between eating and stress.

Feelings of depression can cause a child to overeat. Researchers provided an in-home interview to 9,374 adolescents, in grades seven through 12 and discovered that there was not a direct correlation with children eating in response to depression. Of all the obese adolescents, 8.2% had said to be depressed, compared to 8.9% of the non-obese adolescents who said they were depressed. Antidepressants, however, seem to have very little influence on childhood obesity. Researchers provided a depression questionnaire to 487 overweight/obese subjects and found that 7% of those with low depression symptoms were using antidepressants and had an average BMI score of 44.3, 27% of those with moderate depression symptoms were using antidepressants and had an average BMI score of 44.7, and 31% of those with major depression symptoms were using antidepressants and had an average BMI score of 44.2.

Several studies have also explored the connection between Attention-deficit hyperactivity disorder (ADHD) and obesity in children. A study in 2005 concluded that within a subgroup of children who were hospitalized for obesity, 57.7% had co-morbid ADHD. This relationship between obesity and ADHD may seem counter-intuitive, as ADHD is typically associated with higher level of energy expenditure, which is thought of as a protective factor against obesity. However, these studies determined that children exhibited more signs of predominantly inattentive-type ADHD rather than combined-type ADHD. It is possible, however, that the symptoms of hyperactivity typically present in individuals with combined-type ADHD are simply masked in obese children with ADHD due to their decreased mobility. The same correlation between obesity and ADHD is also present in adult populations. Existing underlying explanations for the relationship between ADHD and obesity in children include but are not limited to abnormalities in the hypo-dopaminergic pathway, ADHD creating abnormal eating behaviors which leads to obesity, or impulsivity associated with binge eating leading to ADHD in obese patients. A systematic review of the literature on the relationship between obesity and ADHD concluded that all reviewed studies reported ADHD patients were heavier than expected. However, the same systematic review also claimed that all the evidence supporting this connection was still limited and further research is still necessary to learn more about this connection. Given the prevalence rates of both obesity and ADHD in children, understanding the possible relationship between the two is important for public health, particularly when exploring treatment and management options.

Direct intervention for psychological treatment of childhood obesity has become more prevalent in recent years. A meta-analysis of the psychological treatment of obesity in children and adolescents found family-based behavioral treatment (FBT) and parent-only behavior treatment to be the most effective practices in treating obesity in children within a psychological framework.

== Management ==
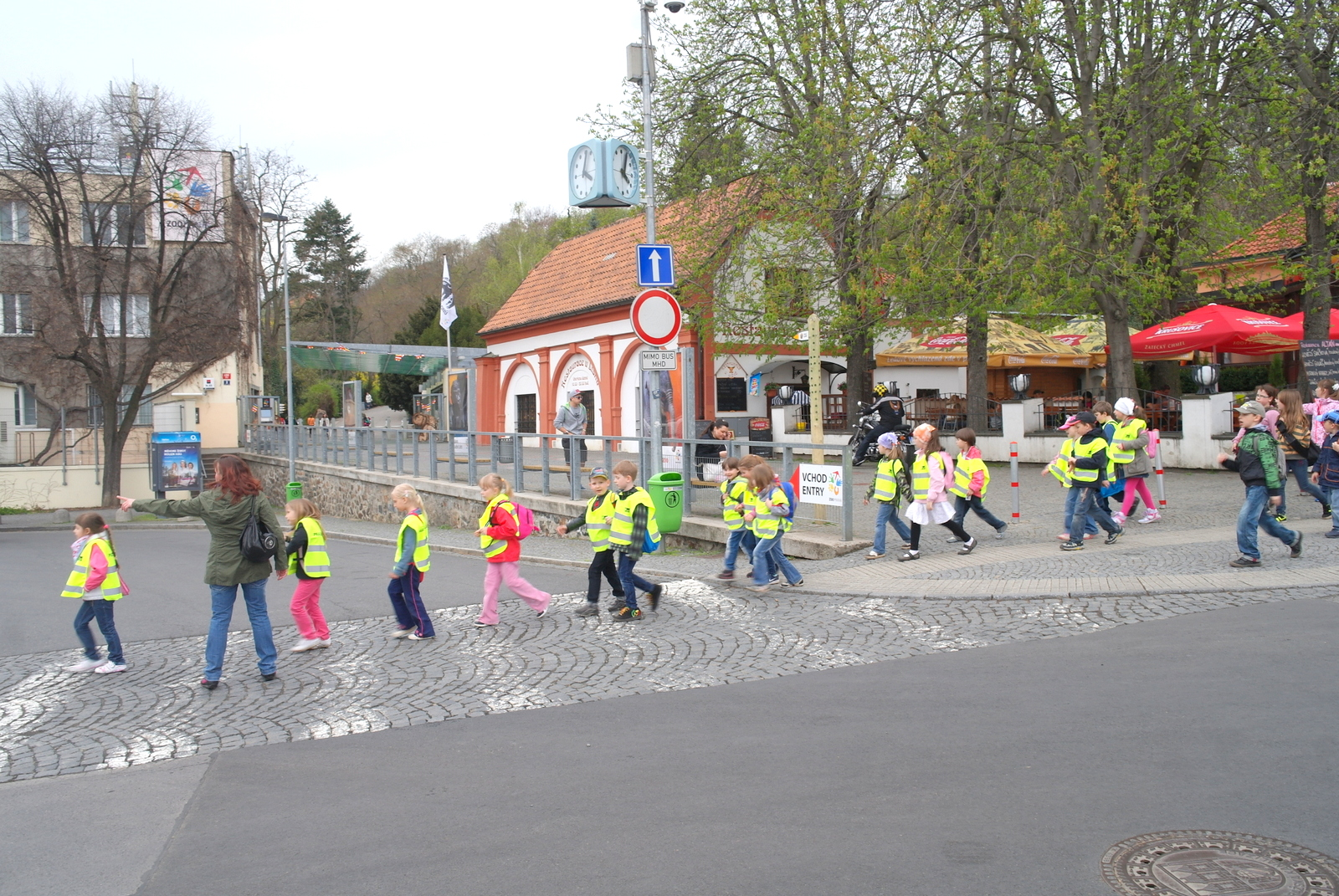
Walking bus, 35/9 Troja, at the entrance to the Prague Zoo.

Obesity in children is treated with dietary changes and physical activity, often through an intensive counselling and lifestyle changes program. At least sixty minutes of daily moderate to high intensity aerobic physical activity is recommended for all children (regardless of BMI). Dieting, including caloric restriction or very low calorie diets, and missing meals should however be discouraged, as it is associated with psychological harm, risks of dietary or nutritional deficiencies and a risk of developing eating disorders later in life. The benefit of tracking BMI and providing counselling around weight is minimal. Brief primary care weight management interventions (e.g. delivered by a physician or nurse practitioner) have only a marginal positive effect in reducing childhood overweight or obesity.

=== Lifestyle ===
Exclusive breastfeeding is recommended in all newborn infants for its nutritional and other beneficial effects. Parents changing the diet and lifestyle of their offspring by offering appropriate food portions, increasing physical activity, and keeping sedentary behaviors at a minimum may also decrease the obesity levels in children.

Promoting more physical activity can help prevent and manage obesity. Walking or riding a bike, instead of using motorised transport or watching television, will reduce sedentary activity.

=== Medications ===
As of 2023 there are several anti-obesity medications which are approved by the FDA for the treatment of obesity in adolescents. These medications are only recommended for use in conjunction with an intensive behavioral and lifestyle counselling program.

- Orlistat is a lipase inhibitor which prevents the absorption of fats after meals. It is approved in children 12 years and older, but use is often limited due to adverse reactions of bowel urgency, fecal incontinence, flatulence and it may cause deficiencies in fat-soluble vitamins.
- Phentermine is an amphetamine analogue which is used as an appetite suppressant; it may be used for up to 12 weeks at a time in adolescents 16 years and older. Possible adverse reactions include headache, nausea, palpitations, elevations in blood pressure, restlessness or insomnia. Phentermine is also available in combination with topiramate extended release and the combination is approved for use in adolescents 12 years and older. Topiramate is an anticonvulsant, but has been shown to cause weight loss. Phentermine-topiramate XR has similar possible side effects to phentermine and users should be on contraception due to the risk of teratogenic effects of the medication.
- Liraglutide and semaglutide are glucagon-like peptide-1 receptor agonists which are approved for the treatment of obesity in adolescents 12 years and older. Liraglutide is a once-daily injection and semaglutide is a once-weekly injection. They are thought to work by delaying gastric emptying, decreasing appetite and increasing satiety. Possible side effects of liraglutide or semaglutide include gastrointestinal distress including nausea, vomiting, diarrhea or constipation, abdominal discomfort or indigestion. Liraglutide and semaglutide should not be used in those with a personal or family history of medullary type thyroid cancers as they may increase the risk of these types of tumors. Their use is further contraindicated in those with acute kidney injury, gallbladder disease or a history of pancreatitis. The FDA prescribing information for semaglutide recommends monitoring for depression or suicidal thoughts during treatment, though a real-world retrospective study of adolescents with obesity found that treatment with liraglutide or semaglutide was associated with a reduced risk for suicidal ideation or attempt.
- Setmelanotide is approved for children six years or older with certain types of secondary obesity. It may cause skin hyperpigmentation or other dermatologic effects as well as gastrointestinal side effects, with rare instances of depression and suicidal ideation.
- Metformin is often used off-label in children or adolescents with obesity, and has been found to cause a 1.1 decrease in BMI. A Cochrane review in 2016 concluded that medications might reduce BMI and bodyweight to a small extent in obese children and adolescents. This conclusion was based only on low-quality evidence.

=== Surgery ===
Bariatric surgical procedures are increasingly used amongst adolescents with severe adolescent obesity to promote weight loss. Laparoscopic adjustable gastric banding showed greater weight loss than lifestyle management in a small study. Roux-en-Y gastric bypass and vertical sleeve gastrectomy are two surgical procedures currently used in adolescent obesity with varying success rates. The two types of procedures have shown a 26% weight loss from baseline at five years with an 86% remission rate in diabetes and 68% hypertension remission rate. Of those adolescents who lost weight after bariatric surgery, 60% maintained at least a 20% weight loss at five-year follow-up and 8% had regained most of the pre-surgical weight. Lack of pre-surgical weight loss is associated with an increased risk of weight gain after bariatric surgery. Other risks of bariatric surgery in adolescents may include nutrient deficiencies (including vitamin B12, folate and iron), the risk of bone mass loss, and a questionable risk of alcohol use disorders later in life.

== Epidemiology ==
Child adolescent obesity

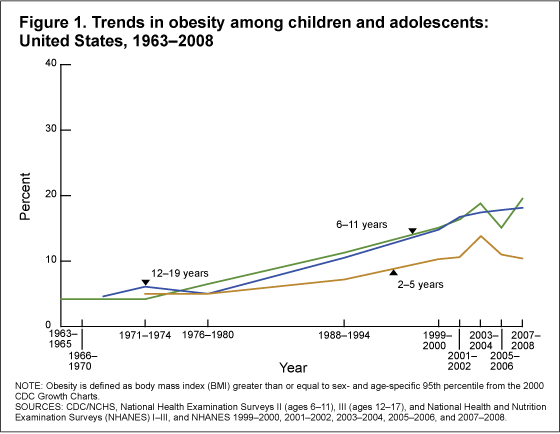
Rates of overweight among children 2 to 19 years in the USA

From 1980 to 2013, the prevalence of overweight and obesity in children increased by nearly 50%. Currently 10% of children worldwide are either overweight or obese. In 2014, the World Health Organization established a high-level commission to end childhood obesity.

With more than 42 million overweight children around the world, childhood obesity is increasing worldwide. Since 1980, the number of obese children has doubled in all three North American countries – Mexico, the United States, and Canada. Although the rate of childhood obesity in the United States has stopped increasing, the current rate remains high. In 2010, 32.6 percent of six- to eleven-year-olds were overweight, and 18 percent of six- to nine-year-olds were obese.

=== Canada ===
The rate of overweight and obesity among Canadian children has increased dramatically in recent years. In boys, the rate increased from 11% in the 1980s to 30% in the 1990s.

=== Brazil ===
The rate of overweight and obesity in Brazilian children increased from 4% in the 1980s to 14% in the 1990s. In 2007 the prevalence of children overweight and childhood obesity was 11.1% and 2.7% in girls, 8.2% and 1.5% in boys, respectively.

=== United States ===
The rate of obesity among children and adolescents in the United States has nearly tripled between the early 1980s and 2000. It has, however, not changed significantly between 2000 and 2006, with the most recent statistics showing a level just over 17 percent. In 2008, the rate of overweight and obese children in the United States was 32%, and had stopped climbing. In 2011, a national cohort study of infants and toddlers found that nearly one-third of US children were overweight or obese at nine months and two years old. In a follow-up study, infant weight status (healthy and obese) was strongly associated with preschool weight status.

=== Australia ===
Since the onset of the 21st century, Australia has found that childhood obesity has followed trend with the United States. Information garnered has concluded that the increase has occurred in lower socioeconomic areas, where poor nutritional education has been blamed.

== Research ==
A study of 1800 children aged two to twelve in Colac, Australia, tested a program of restricted diet (no carbonated drinks or sweets) and increased exercise. Interim results included a 68% increase in after school activity programs, 21% reduction in television viewing, and an average of 1 kg weight reduction compared to a control group.

A survey carried out by the American Obesity Association into parental attitudes towards their children's weight showed the majority of parents think that recess should not be reduced or replaced. Almost 30% said that they were concerned with their child's weight. 35% of parents thought that their child's school was not teaching them enough about childhood obesity, and over 5% thought that childhood obesity was the greatest risk to their child's long-term health.

A Northwestern University study indicates that inadequate sleep has a negative impact on a child's performance in school, their emotional and social welfare, and increases their risk of being overweight. This study was the first nationally represented, longitudinal investigation of the correlation between sleep, body mass index (BMI) and overweight status in children between the ages of 3 and 18. The study found that an extra hour of sleep lowered the children's risk of being overweight from 36% to 30%, while it lessened older children's risk from 34% to 30%.

A 2018 Cochrane review on the impact of physical activity, diet and other behavioral interventions for improving cognition and school achievement in children and adolescents found that school and community-based programs as part of an overall prevention program were beneficial.

Obese children and adolescents are more likely to become obese as adults. For example, one study found that approximately 80% of children who were overweight at aged 10–15 years were obese adults at age 25 years. Another study found that 25% of obese adults were overweight as children. The latter study also found that if overweight begins before 8 years of age, obesity in adulthood is likely to be more severe.

A study has also found that tackling childhood obesity will not necessarily lead to eating disorders later in life.

A review of secular trends in the number of overweight or obese children have come to the conclusion that prevalence had increased during the past two decades in the most industrialised countries, apart from Russia and Poland, and in several low-income countries, especially in urban areas. Prevalence doubled or tripled between the early 1970s and late 1990s in Australia, Brazil, Canada, Chile, Finland, France, Germany, Greece, Japan, the UK, and the USA. By 2010, more than 40% of children in the North American and eastern Mediterranean WHO regions, 38% in Europe, 27% in the western Pacific, and 22% in southeast Asia were predicted to be overweight or obese. However, that 2006 review pre-dates recent data, which, although still too soon to be certain, suggest that the increase in childhood obesity in the US, the UK, and Sweden might be abating.3–5

A British longitudinal study has found that obesity restricted to childhood has minimal influence on adult outcomes at age 30. The study also found that, while obesity that continues into adulthood has little influence on men's outcomes, it makes women less likely to have ever been employed or to currently have a romantic partner.

A 2017 National Bureau of Economic Research paper found that childhood obesity in the United States increases medical costs by $1,354 a year (in 2013 dollars).

== Notable cases ==
The most extreme recorded cases of childhood obesity include:

- Dzhambulat Khatokhov (1999–2020), a Russian boy who weighed 75 lb (34 kg; 5.4 st) at 2 years old and 397 lb (180 kg; 28.4 st) at 13 years old. He was named the world's heaviest child in 2003 by Guinness World Records.
- Jessica Leonard (born c. 1997–1998), also known as Jessica Gaude, an American girl who reportedly weighed 490 lb (220 kg; 35 st) at 7 years old, and 420 lb (190 kg; 30 st) at 8 years old.
- Arya Permana (born 2006), an Indonesian boy who weighed 423 lb (192 kg; 30.2 st) at 11 years old.

Eugenia Martínez Vallejo, a Spanish girl who lived in the 17th century, gained notoriety for her large size and weight and notably became a court jester for Charles II of Spain. Her obesity is today thought to have been caused by Prader-Willi syndrome.

== See also ==
- International Journal of Pediatric Obesity
- Task Force on Childhood Obesity
- Classification of childhood obesity
- Obesity and the environment
- Social influences on fitness behavior
- Social stigma of obesity
- Sugary drink tax
- EPODE International Network

Transport:

- Active mobility
- Children's street culture
- Children's street games
- Cycling mobility
- Home zone / Play street
- Obesity and walking
- Student transport
- Walking bus
