= List of heaviest people =

This is a list of the heaviest people who have been weighed and verified, living and dead. The list is organised by the peak weight reached by an individual and is limited to those who reached 440 kg (970 lb; 69 st 4 lb).

== Heaviest people ever recorded ==
Living Deceased

Name	Country	Sex	Peak weight			Height	Peak BMI kg/m^{2}	Notes	Lifespan (age at death)
Name	Country	Sex	kg	lb	st	Height	Peak BMI kg/m^{2}	Notes	Lifespan (age at death)
Jon Brower Minnoch	United States	M	635 kg	1,400 lb	100 st 0 lb	1.85 m 6 ft 1 in	186	Largest ever documented weight loss, of 419 kg (924 lb; 66 st), until Khalid bin Mohsen Shaari surpassed the record in 2017.	1941–1983 (41)
Khalid bin Mohsen Shaari	Saudi Arabia	M	620 kg	1,370 lb	97 st 9 lb	1.73 m 5 ft 8 in	204	In November 2017, Al Arabiya reported that he had lost 542 kg (1,195 lb; 85 st 5 lb) and now weighed 68 kg (150 lb; 10.7 st).	1991
Manuel Uribe	Mexico	M	610 kg	1,340 lb	96 st 1 lb	1.96 m 6 ft 5 in	175	After world-wide media attention in 2006, he lost over 225 kg (496 lb; 35 st 6 lb) in a two-year period.	1965–2014 (48)
Juan Pedro Franco	Mexico	M	608 kg	1,340 lb	95 st 10 lb			Peak weight measured in October 2016. Reduced 345 kg (761 lb; 54 st 5 lb) by February 2018.	1984–2025 (41)
Robert Butler	United States	M	544 kg	1,200 lb	85 st 9 lb			In 2006 he was 408 kg (899 lb; 64 st 3 lb), reached peak weight in 2015, the year of his death.	1972–2015 (43)
Walter Hudson	United States	M	543 kg	1,197 lb	85 st 7 lb	1.78 m 5 ft 10 in	171	Had the largest waist ever in circumference at 9 ft 11 in (3.02 m).	1944–1991 (47)
Carol Yager	United States	F	539.5 kg	1,189 lb	84 st 13 lb	1.70 m 5 ft 7 in	186	Heaviest woman ever recorded. Peak weight of 727 kg (1,603 lb; 114 st 7 lb) (Disputed). Confirmed weight of 539.5 kg (1,189 lb; 84 st 13 lb) Lost 236 kg (520 lb; 37 st 2 lb) in three months on a 1,200 kcal per day diet.	1960–1994 (34)
Francis John Lang (Michael Walker)	United States	M	538 kg	1,186 lb	84 st 10 lb	1.88 m 6 ft 2 in	152	In 1980, he weighed 167 kg (368 lb; 26 st 4 lb).	1934–1982 (48)
Eman Ahmed Abd El Aty	Egypt	F	500 kg	1,100 lb	78 st 10 lb	1.40 m 4 ft 7 in	251.1	Second heaviest woman in history. Before her death, she lost around 325 kg (717 lb; 51 st 3 lb) in weight-loss treatment.	1980–2017 (37)
Michael Hebranko	United States	M	499 kg	1,100 lb	78 st 8 lb	1.83 m 6 ft 0 in	149		1953–2013 (60)
Patrick Deuel	United States	M	486 kg	1,071 lb	76 st 7 lb	1.70 m 5 ft 7 in	168		1962–2016 (54)
Robert Earl Hughes	United States	M	485 kg	1,069 lb	76 st 5 lb	1.84 m 6 ft 0 in	143	Heaviest human to be able to walk.	1926–1958 (32)
Rosalie Bradford	United States	F	477 kg	1,052 lb	75 st 2 lb	1.68 m 5 ft 6 in	169	Holds the Guinness World Record for most weight lost by a woman, 349 kg (769 lb; 54 st 13 lb).	1943–2006 (63)
Mills Darden	United States	M	476 kg	1,049 lb	74 st 13 lb	2.29 m 7 ft 6 in	88		1798–1857 (58)
Mayra Rosales	United States	F	470 kg	1,040 lb	74 st 0 lb	1.60 m 5 ft 3 in	184	As of 2013, had lost an estimated 363 kg (800 lb; 57 st 2 lb).	1980–2024 (43)
Kenneth Brumley	United States	M	468 kg	1,032 lb	73 st 10 lb				1968
Andre Nasr	Australia	M	468 kg	1,032 lb	73 st 10 lb				1980
Mike Parteleno	United States	M	464 kg	1,023 lb	73 st 1 lb	1.90 m 6 ft 3 in	129		1957–2003 (45)
Carol Haffner	United States	F	464 kg	1,023 lb	73 st 1 lb				1936–1995 (59)
Sean Milliken	United States	M	455 kg	1,003 lb	71 st 9 lb			Featured on the TV show My 600-lb Life.	1989–2019 (29)
Catrina Raiford	United States	F	454 kg	1,000 lb	71 st 7 lb	1.57 m 5 ft 2 in	184		1977
Sylvanus Smith	United States	M	454 kg	1,000 lb	71 st 7 lb	1.89 m 6 ft 2 in	127		1940–1995 (54)
David Ron High	United States	M	454 kg	1,000 lb	71 st 7 lb	1.78 m 5 ft 10 in	143		1953–1996 (43)
Michael Edelman	United States	M	451 kg	994 lb	71 st 0 lb				1964–1992 (28)
José Luis Garza	Mexico	M	449 kg	990 lb	70 st 10 lb				1961–2008 (47)
Paul Mason	United Kingdom	M	445 kg	981 lb	70 st 1 lb	1.93 m 6 ft 4 in	119	In 2014 weighed 140 kg (310 lb; 22 st 1 lb), a total weight loss of 304 kg (670 lb; 47 st 12 lb).	1960
Keith Martin	United Kingdom	M	445 kg	981 lb	70 st 1 lb	1.69 m 5 ft 7 in	155		1970–2014 (44)
Denny Welch	United States	M	444 kg	979 lb	69 st 13 lb				1960–1998 (37)
Andrés Moreno	Mexico	M	444 kg	979 lb	69 st 13 lb			Died on Christmas Day, 2015, due to his morbid obesity.	1977–2015 (38)
Samantha Mason	United States	F	442 kg	974 lb	69 st 8 lb			Featured on the TV show My 600-lb Life. Has since dropped to 496 lb (225 kg; 35 st 6 lb).	1985

== See also ==
- Edward Bright (1721–1750) and Daniel Lambert (1770–1809), men from England who were famous in their time for their obesity.
- Happy Humphrey, the heaviest professional wrestler, weighing in at 410 kg (900 lb; 64 st 8 lb) at his peak.
- Israel Kamakawiwoʻole (1959–1997), Hawaiian singer whose weight peaked at 343 kg (756 lb; 54 st 0 lb).
- Paul Kimelman (born 1947), holder of Guinness World Record for the greatest weight-loss in the shortest amount of time (1982).
- Billy and Benny McCrary, holders of Guinness World Records's World's Heaviest Twins.
- Dzhambulat Khatokhov (1999–2020), declared the heaviest child in the world in 2003 by Guinness World Records
- Alayna Morgan (1948–2009), heavy woman from Santa Rosa, California.
- Ricky Naputi (1973–2012), heaviest man from Guam.
- Carl Thompson (1982–2015), heaviest man in the United Kingdom whose weight at death was 413 kg (911 lb; 65 st 1 lb).
- Renee Williams (1977–2007), woman from Austin, Texas.
- Yokozuna, the heaviest WWE wrestler, weighing between 267 kg (589 lb; 42 st 1 lb) and 317 kg (699 lb; 49 st 13 lb) at his peak.
- Barry Austin and Jack Taylor, two obese British men documented in the comedy-drama The Fattest Man in Britain.
- Big Pun (1971–2000), American rapper whose weight at death was 316 kg (697 lb; 49 st 11 lb).
- Dave Blunts (born 2000), African-American rapper and singer who weighed over 600 pounds (270 kg) at his peak.
- Yamamotoyama Ryūta, heaviest Japanese-born sumo wrestler; also thought to be the heaviest Japanese person ever at 265 kg (584 lb; 41 st 10 lb).
