= ATY =

Aty or ATY may refer to:

- ATY, IATA code for Watertown Regional Airport
- ATY, TSX ticker of ATI Technologies
- aty, ISO 639-3 for the Aneityum language
- Aty, IMA symbol of Anthonyite
- Aty Seikuinduwa, or Belkis Florentina Izquierdo Torres, Colombian judge
- Aty, character in Summon Night 3

== See also ==
- Eman Ahmed Abd El Aty
