= Naputi =

Naputi is a surname. Notable people with the surname include:

- Dylan Naputi (born 1995), Guamanian footballer
- Ricky Naputi (1973–2012), Guamanian man who died from overeating
