= Defence Universities Alliance =

Initiative of the UK government

The Defence Universities Alliance (DUA) is an initiative of the UK government to form closer ties between a group of universities selected by the Ministry of Defence (MOD) and the armed forces. The aims of the alliance are to support research into defence technologies, to encourage students into defence-related careers, and to encourage collaboration in defence between government, universities and industry.

== History ==
The roots of the DUA were in papers prepared by Labour before the 2024 general election and leaked to The Daily Telegraph that called for the UK to set up a "Universities Defence Alliance" with defence-focused universities, similar to China's Seven Sons of National Defence. At the time, Labour stated that the proposals were in being worked on and were not official policy. John Healey, who became the UK's Secretary of State for Defence after the election, worked on the plans together with Paul Mason, who also called for a "Universities Tech Alliance" in a report co-authored with William Freer for the Council on Geostrategy in March 2025.

The DUA was announced as part of the government's defence industrial strategy in September 2025, when it was expected to consist of six to eight universities. The Sunday Times reported that MOD officials believed that obvious partner universities would be ones with existing MOD or defence industry links such as Cranfield, Strathclyde, Plymouth, Queen's University Belfast and Ulster.

In February 2026, the Office for Students (OfS) issued a funding call for defence-related skills that included "Alignment with objectives of Defence Universities Alliance" as one of its criteria. The MOD issued a call for "up to 20 founding members of the DUA" in April 2026, seeking applications from universities, as well as releasing the DUA Charter. The call was limited to institutions that held university title and required institutions to meet a research security baseline defined by the National Protective Security Agency, and to show a track record in at least one area of defence-related research, skills or careers. The call also set out the objectives of advancing defence research, promoting defence skills and careers, and fostering partnerships between government, academia and industry.

In July 2026, the MoD announced 35 founder members of the DUA, from almost 100 applicants. Luke Pollard, the Minister of State for Defence Readiness and Industry, formally launched the alliance at the University of Manchester. Along with Manchester, the founder universities included Durham, Loughborough, Lincoln, Nottingham, Oxford, UCL and Queen's University Belfast, as well as King’s College London and Cranfield University who had announced that they would be merging a few months earlier. The Tab noted that although 19 of the Russell Group of Universities had been included in the alliance, Cambridge, Imperial and the LSE were absent, as were Leeds and Southampton. Imperial's president, Hugh Brady, had previously stated that it had applied to join the DUA.

The formation of the DUA was criticised by several student leaders, including the president of higher education for the National Union of Students. Student officers at the University of Manchester Students' Union claimed the alliance was creating "a direct pipeline of students into military and weapons-related industries".

== Members ==
The university members of the DUA are:

University	Country or region
Durham University	North East England
Newcastle University	North East England
Northumbria University	North East England
Lancaster University	North West England
University of Cumbria	North West England
University of Lancashire	North West England
University of Liverpool	North West England
University of Manchester	North West England
University of Huddersfield	Yorkshire and the Humber
University of Sheffield	Yorkshire and the Humber
University of York	Yorkshire and Humberside
Loughborough University	East Midlands
University of Lincoln	East Midlands
University of Nottingham	East Midlands
Aston University	West Midlands
University of Birmingham	West Midlands
University of Warwick	West Midlands
King’s College London	London
Kingston University	London
Queen Mary University of London	London
University College London	London
University of Oxford	South East England
University of Portsmouth	South East England
University of Surrey	South East England
University of Bath	South West England
University of Bristol	South West England
University of Exeter	South West England
University of Plymouth	South West England
University of Edinburgh	Scotland
University of Glasgow	Scotland
University of Strathclyde	Scotland
Cardiff University	Wales
Swansea University	Wales
Queen's University Belfast	Northern Ireland
Cranfield University	East of England
