= Walter Hudson (disambiguation) =

Walter Hudson may refer to:

- Walter Hudson (1944–1991), sixth most obese human in medical history
- Walter Hudson (British politician) (1852–1935), English Labour Party politician, MP for Newcastle upon Tyne, 1906–1918
- Walter Hudson (Minnesota politician), American politician from Minnesota
- Wally Hudson (1898–1972), New Zealand Labour Party politician, MP for Mornington (Dunedin), 1946-63
- Walter Richard Austen Hudson (1894–1970), British Conservative Party politician, MP for Kingston upon Hull North, 1950–1959
