= Renee Williams =

Largest woman in the world

Reneé Williams Altovise
- Born: June 4, 1977; Austin, Texas, United States
- Died: March 4, 2007 (aged 29)

Renee Williams (June 4, 1977 – March 4, 2007) was an American woman believed to be the largest woman in the world at the time of her death in 2007 from complications following her surgery for morbid obesity. Williams was also one of the heaviest people to ever live and one of the heaviest ever to undergo gastric bypass. By the age of 12, Williams was already in the category of super-morbid obesity, which refers to a body mass index over 50. After a car crash in 2003 she became unable to walk, which further contributed to her weight gain.

Williams was featured in the American television program Amazing Medical Stories and she was also the subject of a British television program called Half Ton Mum broadcast on Channel 4 after her death as part of the BodyShock series. The program stated that she also held the world record for being the heaviest person ever to have gastric bypass surgery on her stomach at 63 stone, or around 880 lbs. When Williams went to the hospital for her gastric bypass, her Body Mass Index was calculated by the doctors to be over 160, where a BMI of 50+ is considered "super-morbidly obese". She was treated by the same medical team as Kenneth Brumley, subject of the counterpart documentary Half Ton Dad, which included My 600-lb Life's Dr. Younan Nowzaradan.

She suffered a heart attack post surgery and was buried at Santa Maria Cemetery in Travis County, Texas.

== See also ==
- Donna Simpson (internet celebrity), heaviest woman to give birth
- List of heaviest people
