= Rosalie Bradford =

Guinness World's heaviest woman (1943–2006)

- Born: August 27, 1943
- Died: November 29, 2006 (aged 63); Lakeland, Florida, U.S.
- Known for: Holding the Guinness World Record for world's heaviest woman
- Spouse: Bob Bradford

Rosalie Bradford (August 27, 1943 – November 29, 2006) was an American woman who once held the Guinness World Record as the world's heaviest woman.

== Weight gain ==
In her early twenties she met a man whom she married. The couple eventually had a son. Bradford found herself staying home with their son and cooking a lot. Her weight continued to accelerate uncontrollably, as did her appetite. She eventually tried several diets and joined Weight Watchers with little success.

Finally, after a blood infection landed her in the hospital, Bradford gave up on exercise altogether when the necessary bed rest allowed for her weight gain to accelerate. She remained immobile for eight years. She measured at 1,200 pounds (540 kg) in January 1987. In 1988, she became so depressed and frustrated that she attempted suicide with painkillers, although, due to her weight, these only made her sleep for a couple of days.

== Weight loss ==
A concerned friend contacted Richard Simmons, a familiar face in the weight loss industry. Simmons then contacted Bradford and spoke to her at length. She recalled Simmons saying, "God doesn’t make junk and you are worth the effort." After the phone call, she received a package from him containing some exercise tapes and an eating plan.

Bradford started small by clapping her hands along to the videos. "It was the only movement I could do," she explained. She focused on her diet and stuck to Simmons’ plan. After a year she had dropped 420 pounds (190 kg). Eventually she got some more outside help from a physiotherapist and soon her weight dropped to 500 pounds (230 kg), a total weight loss of 553 pounds (251 kg). Bradford persisted with her weight-loss plan and eventually reduced her weight to 283 pounds (128 kg), claiming a total weight loss of 917 pounds (416 kg). The lymphatic system in her legs was damaged in one of five surgeries to remove excess skin left by her weight loss.

Bradford appeared on the Channel 4 television program BodyShock giving advice to Patrick Deuel. The episode was first broadcast in August 2007.

== Death ==
Rosalie Bradford died on November 29, 2006, at a hospital in Lakeland (near her Auburndale, Florida, home). She was 63 years old, and was surrounded by her husband Bob Bradford and son Robbie. She lost the world record of having lost the most weight by a woman to Mayra Rosales in 2013.

== Statistics ==
- Weight: 1200 pounds (544 kg)
- BMI: 193.7
- Height: 5 foot 6 inches (1.68 m)

== See also ==
- List of the heaviest people
- Obesity
