= The Elephant Man (disambiguation) =

Joseph Merrick (1862–1890) was an Englishman known as "The Elephant Man" because of his physical appearance caused by a congenital defect.

Elephant Man or The Elephant Man may also refer to

== People ==
- Gyles Mackrell (1888–1959), British tea planter known for organising elephants to rescue refugees during World War II
- Elephant Man (musician), real name O'Neil Bryan (born 1975), Jamaican musician
- Huang Chuncai (born 1977), "China's Elephant Man"

== Entertainment ==
- The Elephant Man (play), a 1977 Broadway play by Bernard Pomerance
- The Elephant Man (1980 film), a 1980 film directed by David Lynch
- The Elephant Man (1982 film), a 1982 television adaptation of the play adapted by Steve Lawson and directed by Jack Hofsiss
- Joseph Merrick, the Elephant man, an opera piece of Laurent Petitgirard
- Elephantmen, fictional characters in the comic book series of the same name, published by Image Comics
- "Elephant Man", a song by English band Suede from the 1999 album Head Music
- "Elephant Man", a song by Atlanta progressive metal band Mastodon from their 2002 album Remission
