= Eman Ahmed Abd El Aty =

Egyptian former heaviest living woman in the world (1980–2017)

Eman
- Born: 9 September 1980; Alexandria, Egypt
- Died: 25 September 2017 (aged 37); Abu Dhabi, United Arab Emirates
- Known for: Second heaviest woman ever recorded
- Height: 4 ft 7 1/2 in (141 cm)

Eman Ahmed Abd El Aty (Egyptian Arabic: ايمان احمد عبد العاطى; 9 September 1980 – 25 September 2017) was an Egyptian considered to be the second heaviest woman in history, after Carol Yager. However, at 4 feet 7 1/2 inches (141 cm), Eman was about a foot shorter than 5-foot-7-inch (170 cm) Yager, giving her the highest recorded BMI at 251.1 and body fat percentage. Her initial weight was claimed to be around 500 kilograms (1,100 lb).

== Early life ==
Abd El Aty was born in Egypt and she lived in Alexandria. Her family has stated that she weighed 5 kg (11 lb) at birth. She suffered from a thyroid problem and had to stop school.

== Treatment ==
In February 2017, Abd El Aty travelled to Saifee Hospital at Mumbai, India, where a group of doctors, headed by Muffazal Lakdawala, treated her successfully using bariatric surgery. They included an endocrinologist, a chest physician, cardiologist, a cardiac surgeon, two bariatric surgeons, two intensivists, and three anaesthetists. She remained in Mumbai after the operation for several months. The aim was to perform two operations, and during the next three and a half years, reduce her weight to less than 100 kg (220 lb).

She lost about 325 kg (720 lb) after undergoing weight-loss treatment in India. She left on 4 May 2017 for the United Arab Emirates for long-term treatment. The doctors, treating her, said she was also suffering from a "cardiac issue" and infected bed sores. She was being treated by a team of 20 doctors at Abu Dhabi's Burjeel Hospital.

== Death ==
Abd El Aty died on Monday, 25 September 2017 at 4:35 pm, 16 days after her 37th birthday, due to complications from the underlying comorbid conditions, including heart disease and kidney dysfunction, at Burjeel Hospital, Abu Dhabi, UAE since her admission to the hospital in May.
