= Paul Mason =

Paul Mason may refer to:

- Paul Mason (writer) (1898–1985), American author
- Paul Mason (bishop) (Paul James Mason, born 1962), Roman Catholic bishop in Southwark
- Paul Mason (coach), American football player and coach
- Paul Mason (coastwatcher) (1901–1972), Australian coastwatcher and member of the Legislative Council of Papua and New Guinea
- Paul Mason (Kentucky politician) (1935–1998), member of the Kentucky House of Representatives
- Paul Mason (diplomat) (1904–1978), British ambassador
- Paul Mason (footballer) (born 1963), British footballer
- Paul Mason (journalist) (born 1960), British journalist and writer
- Paul Mason (meteorologist) (Paul James Mason, born 1946), British meteorologist
- Paul Mason (sculptor) (1952–2006), British sculptor
- Paul Mason (obese man) (born 1960), Britain's heaviest man
- Paul Nicholas Mason (born 1958), Canadian novelist, playwright, and journalist
- Pablo Mason or Paul Mason, British author and retired Royal Air Force pilot

== See also ==
- Paul Masson (1859–1940), winemaker
- Paul Masson (cyclist) (1876–1944), French cyclist at the 1896 Olympics
