= Kenneth Brumley =

One of the world's heaviest people

Kenneth Brumley (born 1968) is one of the heaviest people ever recorded whose weight was confirmed. He was featured on the Channel 4 documentary "Half Ton Dad", as a father of four who weighed 1,033 pounds (468 kg).

== Early life ==
As a child, Brumley played basketball, baseball, and American football which kept his weight healthy, but after a move to California at age 19, he stopped playing and the weight began to accumulate.

== Later life ==
At his heaviest, Brumley had a daily caloric intake of approximately 30,000 calories and his weight fluctuated as much as 9 pounds a day.

According to Kenneth Brumley's statements in the documentary, he had been bed-bound for fifteen years. After he was accepted as a gastric bypass patient at the Renaissance Hospital in Houston, a fire crew had to hammer down a wall in Brumley’s house to get him out.

At Renaissance Hospital, Brumley was treated by the specialist team that treated Renee Williams, believed to have been the world's heaviest woman at the time. The first step in Brumley's treatment was a diet restricted to 1200 calories per day, which made him lose 167.5 pounds (76 kg) in only 40 days.

== See also ==
- List of the heaviest people
- Obesity
