= Khalid bin Mohsen Shaari =

Saudi Arabian former heaviest living person (born 1991)

- خَالِدْ بِنْ مُحْسِنْ الشَّاعْرِي
- Born: 28 February 1991 (age 35); Saudi Arabia
- Known for: Heaviest living person Second heaviest person ever Highest recorded BMI ever
- Height: 5 ft 8 in (173 cm)

Khalid bin Mohsen Shaari (Arabic: خالد بن محسن الشاعري; born 28 February 1991) is a Saudi Arabian man, who in August 2013 was found to be the heaviest living person, and the second-heaviest person in recorded history at 610 kg (1,340 lb; 96 st), behind Jon Brower Minnoch. As a result of medical treatment, he lost a total of 320 kg (710 lb; 50 st)—more than half his body weight—in six months.

== Early life ==
Khalid bin Mohsen Shaari was born in Saudi Arabia on 28 February 1991. He was 22 when he was declared the "fattest man alive" in 2013, with a BMI of 204.

== Weight loss ==
In August 2013, Saudi King Abdullah offered him to come from his home in Jizan to King Fahad Medical City in the country's capital, Riyadh, to undergo a series of dietary and physical programs to help him lose weight. In February 2016, due to the weight loss treatment, he was able to walk for the first time in five years, with the help of a walker. By November 2017, he had lost 542 kg (1,195 lb; 85.4 st) and now weighs 68 kg (150 lb; 10.7 st). In January 2018, he had the last of a series of surgeries to remove excess skin that accumulated due to his weight loss.
