= Michael Hebranko =

American obese man (1953–2013)

- Born: Michael John Hebranko Jr. May 14, 1953; New York City, US
- Died: July 25, 2013 (aged 60)
- Known for: Being one of the heaviest men in the world

Michael Hebranko (May 14, 1953 – July 25, 2013) was an American man who suffered from an extreme case of morbid obesity and was one of the heaviest men in the world.

== Biography ==
Hebranko was born in Brooklyn on May 14, 1953, to Michael Hebranko Sr. and Jeanette Pica. His paternal grandfather was a Ukrainian immigrant.

After a stay at the St. Luke’s Hospital in New York City, he dropped his weight from 411 kg (906 lb) to 90 kg (200 lb) and waist size from 290 cm (110 in) to 91 cm (36 in) in 19 months with the help of the dieting and exercise coach Richard Simmons, and was recorded in the Guinness Book of World Records for the highest recorded weight loss in 1990. He lost some of this weight from surgical removal of fat. He then toured the United States lecturing about his experiences and advocating dieting and exercise and appeared in infomercials promoting Richard Simmons. He also appeared on TV talk shows such as The Howard Stern Show, The Oprah Winfrey Show and the British chat show Wogan in 1990.

However, over the next seven years, his weight increased to 453 kg (999 lb) and he had to be repeatedly hospitalized at the Brookhaven Rehabilitation and Health Care Center. In June 1999, Hebranko was at his peak weight of 499 kg (1,100 lb), before again undergoing a massive weight loss and dropping to 207.5 kg (457 lb). In March 2012, he resided in Staten Island, New York, and weighed 250 kg (550 lb).

He died on July 25, 2013.

== See also ==
- List of the heaviest people
