= Grand Island Senior High School (Nebraska) =

Grand Island Senior High

Location
- 2124 Lafayette Avenue; Grand Island, Hall County, Nebraska 68803; United States; 40°56′33″N 98°21′56″W

Information
- Other name: Academies of Grand Island Senior High School
- Former name: Grand Island High School
- Mottoes: Every Student, Every Day, A Success!; Wear Purple, Be Gold!
- Superintendent: Matthew Fisher
- Principal: Calvin Hubbard
- Teaching staff: 166.72 (FTE)
- Grades: 9 to 12
- Enrollment: 2,567 (2020-21)
- Student to teacher ratio: 15.4
- Education system: Academy
- Hours in school day: 8
- Colors: Purple and gold
- Athletics conference: Heartland Athletics Conference
- Team name: Islanders
- Rival: Kearney Bearcats
- Website: www.gips.org/senior

Grand Island Senior High is the only high school in the Grand Island Public Schools (GIPS) system in Nebraska, United States. It has had several buildings over its history. The official mascot is the Islander, a tall man in a tropical grass skirt.

== History ==
In 1908, a new building was built for high school students at 10th Street and Walnut Street, although high school education in an all-grades building had been going on before that. In 1925, a new building was constructed at 504 Elm Street; the 1908 building was turned into a junior high school.

In 1955, a fourth building was constructed in the 2100 block of Lafayette Avenue and its predecessor became Walnut Junior High. In the late 1990s, a two-story section was added onto the main building.

GISH adopted an "academy" system for the 2019-2020 school year, making students choose one of five tracks to focus on. As a part of this system, Grand Island Senior High has expanded to three total campuses, including a technically focused Career Pathways Institute, and an education, law and public safety focused Wyandotte Learning Center.

== Athletics ==
Islander athletic teams compete in the Heartland Athletic Conference.

State Championships
Sport	Year(s)
Baseball	2008
Basketball (boys)	1947*, 1948, 1953, 2002
Football	1936, 1947, 1948, 1978
Track and field (girls)	1973, 1975, 2007
Wrestling	2009, 2015, 2016, 2017, 2018, 2019

- denotes co-championship

== Performing arts ==
Grand Island has three competitive show choirs, the mixed-gender "Ultimate Image" and "Future Image" as well as the all-female "Sweet Revelation". The program also hosts an annual competition, the Islander Invitational.

== Notable alumni ==
- Patrick Deuel, one of the heaviest people in the world
- Tom Rathman, National Football League (NFL) fullback (San Francisco 49ers, Oakland Raiders)
- Bobby Reynolds, football halfback
- Rebecca Richards-Kortum, Rice University professor, MacArthur Fellow
- Jeff Richardson, Major League Baseball infielder (Cincinnati Reds, Pittsburgh Pirates, Boston Red Sox)
- Bob Smith, NFL halfback
