= Alayna Morgan =

American heavyweight woman (1948–2009)

Alayna Marie Morgan (May 21, 1948 – November 7, 2009) was an American woman from Santa Rosa, California, who was renowned as one of the world's heaviest people, weighing an estimated 700 pounds (317,5 kg; 50 stone) at her peak weight. She was once featured in an episode of Supersize vs Superskinny programmed by Channel 4.

== Early life ==
Morgan had a strained relationship with her father, and was sexually abused as a child and young adult. She developed a wide range of eating disorders such as bulimia, which she developed when she was 8 years old.

== See also ==
- List of the heaviest people
