= Fishhook, Illinois =

Fishhook
- Unincorporated community
- Location of Fishhook within Illinois Fishhook (the United States)
- Coordinates: 39°48′20″N 90°53′07″W
- Country: United States
- State: Illinois
- County: Pike
- Elevation: 751 ft (229 m)
- Time zone: UTC-6 (CST)
  - Summer (DST): UTC-5 (CDT)
- ZIP code: 62314
- Area code: 217
- GNIS feature ID: 0408403

Fishhook is an unincorporated community in Pike County, Illinois, United States.

== Notable residents ==
Fishhook is where Robert Earl Hughes, once billed the world's largest man by the Guinness Book of World Records, grew up. The town has a small monument in its business district.
