= Carol Yager =

Heaviest woman in history

- Born: Carol Ann Yager; January 26, 1960; Flint, Michigan, US
- Died: July 18, 1994 (aged 34); Flint, Michigan, US
- Known for: Heaviest woman ever recorded

Carol Ann Yager (January 26, 1960 – July 18, 1994) was an American woman who is the heaviest woman ever recorded and one of the most severely obese people in history.

== Weight ==
Published reports said Yager's peak weight was about 1,603 lb (727 kg; 114.5 st). She lost the most weight by non-surgical means in the shortest documented time: 521 lb (236 kg) in three months.

Bizarre magazine reported that she was estimated to have been more than 5 feet (1.5 m) wide, although this measurement has not been verified by Yager's medical team or family members. Shortly before her death, however, she was able to fit through her custom-built front door, which had a width of 48 inches (121.9 cm).

== Biography ==
Yager stated that she had developed an eating disorder as a child in response to being sexually abused by a "close family member", although in later interviews, she indicated that there were other contributing factors to her obesity. At the same time, she denied eating anything more than normal quantities of food.

She lived most of her life in Beecher, Michigan, in Mount Morris Township, near Flint, and was cared for in her final years by health care professionals, friends, her daughter Heather and son Stephen Bishop, and other family members, many of whom visited daily. Eventually, she was moved into a nursing home.

She appeared on The Jerry Springer Show and caught the attention of several dieting gurus.

== Health problems ==
In January 1993, Yager was admitted to Hurley Medical Center, weighing in at 1,189 lb (539 kg). She suffered from cellulitis due to a bacterial infection, and immunodeficiency. She stayed in the hospital for three months, where she was restricted to a 1,200–calorie diet, and while there lost 521 lb (236 kg), though most of this was believed to have been fluid. (Severely obese people often suffer from edema, and their weight can fluctuate rapidly as fluid is taken up or released.) Yager suffered from many other obesity-related health problems as well, including breathing difficulty, a dangerously high blood sugar level, and stress on her heart and other organs.

Yager was not able to stand or walk, because her muscles were not strong enough to support her, due in part to muscle atrophy from disuse. Yager was hospitalized 13 times in two years, according to Beecher Fire Department chief Bennie Zappa. Each trip required as many as 15 to 20 firefighters from two stations to assist paramedics to convey Yager to the ambulance in relay fashion. One team inside the house would pass her through the doorway to another team on the outside, who would pass her to another team inside the ambulance, where she would ride on the floor.

== Death ==
Yager died in Flint on July 18, 1994. A short time before her death, Yager's latest boyfriend, Larry Maxwell, who was characterized by her family as being "an opportunist who courted media attention for money-making possibilities", married her friend, Felicia White. Maxwell had said that the only donation in Yager's name he ever received was for $20, although numerous talk shows, newspapers, radio stations, and other national and international media are reported to have offered her cash and other gifts in exchange for interviews, pictures, etc. Dietary educator Richard Simmons was quoted as saying that he was "angry that Yager's story was actively peddled to tabloid and television media by Maxwell and others".

Yager's death certificate lists kidney failure as the cause of death, with morbid obesity and multiple organ failure as contributing causes.

Yager was buried privately, with about 90 friends and family members attending memorial services.

== See also ==
- List of heaviest people
- Obesity

Records
| Preceded by Rosalie Bradford | Heaviest woman ever recorded 1994–present | Incumbent |
