= Manuel Uribe (obese man) =

Third-heaviest person in history

- Uribe on his wedding day in October 2008
- Born: Manuel Uribe Garza; 11 June 1965; Monterrey, Nuevo León, Mexico
- Died: 26 May 2014 (aged 48); Monterrey, Nuevo León, Mexico
- Occupation: Computer repairman
- Known for: Third heaviest person ever recorded
- Height: 6 ft 5 in (196 cm)
- Spouse: Claudia Solís (m. 2008–2010)

Manuel Uribe Garza (11 June 1965 – 26 May 2014) was a Mexican man who was morbidly obese to one of the greatest extents known in recorded history. After reaching a peak weight of around 600 kg (1,300 lb) and having been unable to leave his bed since 2002, he lost approximately 230 kg (510 lb)—over one third of his body weight—with the help of doctors and nutritionists by February 2008. However, he died in his hometown on 26 May 2014 weighing 394 kg (869 lb).

Uribe drew worldwide attention in January 2006, when he made an emotional plea on a Mexican television network that prompted both private and public assistance. He was also featured on The World's Heaviest Man, a 2007 television documentary about his bedridden life and attempts to overcome his obesity, and in The World's Heaviest Man Gets Married, a similar documentary that was broadcast in 2009 by the Discovery Channel.

== Personal life ==
Uribe lived in San Nicolás de los Garza, a suburb of Monterrey, Nuevo León, and according to the Associated Press he weighed 115 kg (254 lb) during his adolescence. "I used to eat normal, just like all Mexicans do ... beans, rice, flour tortilla, corn tortilla, french fries, hamburgers, subs and pizzas, whatever regular people eat". He married his first wife in 1987 and the couple immigrated to the United States for employment opportunities. They settled in Dallas, Texas, where he was employed as a technician fixing typewriters, electronic calculators, and computers. The nature of his job required Uribe to spend his day sitting at a desk. Reflecting on those years, Uribe commented: "Life in the United States is like that, you just go from your desk to your car. I used to drive my car to and from work, so I didn't get any exercise".

His sedentary lifestyle may have contributed to the onset of his morbid obesity because it appears to be, according to a scientific study published in Clinical Cardiology, one of the major risk factors including a poor diet. After five years living in a new country, his obesity sharply increased and took a toll on his emotional stability: "[My wife] asked me for a divorce ... I was very depressed ... Everything ended on account of my obesity, because I spent a lot of money trying to see doctors, going on diets, and I just gained more weight."

== Diet and weight loss ==
Manuel Uribe returned to Mexico and eventually made an emotional plea for help on national television. The government appointed a group of doctors and certified nutritionists to help him lose weight, but while he turned down offers for gastric bypass surgery in Italy and Spain, he caught the attention of Barry Sears, the creator of the Zone diet. Sears prescribed him a diet high in protein and low in carbohydrates that consisted of five meals in small portions that included egg-white omelets, salads, chicken, fish, fruits and spring greens. His dramatic reduction in weight – reportedly 230 kg (510 lb) by February 2008 – prompted him to set his sights on a second Guinness World Record: "The World's Greatest Loser of Weight", which presumably was never certified.

Uribe tried to capitalize on his new-found fame by announcing plans to launch the Manuel Uribe Foundation, an institution aiming to educate Mexican people about nutrition and obesity, but the organization was never legally constituted. On 3 October 2008, he gave diet advice to José Luis Garza, a critically obese and bedridden fellow Mexican who weighed 449 kg (990 lb). Garza, a former chef at a bowling alley who was unable to get out of his bed for four months, commented: "Manuel inspires me with courage and the will to live. I understand that this is a matter of life and death and that I have to follow the instructions that are given to me." Uribe's girlfriend Claudia Solís visited Garza's home with kiwifruit, grapefruit, pears, and protein supplements, and Uribe promised to help Garza get a wheel-equipped iron bed; however, Garza died five days later on 8 October 2008.

== Second wedding ==
On 26 October 2008, after four years together, Uribe – who weighed in at 318 kg (701 lb) after shedding 269 kg (593 lb) – married his second wife Claudia from his bed. He said: "I am proof you can find love in any circumstances. It's all a question of faith. I have a wife and will form a new family and live a happy life." He was transported to the civil wedding on his specially-reinforced four-poster bed, draped with cream and gold and adorned in bright sunflowers, on the back of a truck. Donning a white silk shirt with a sheet around his legs, he waited to greet Claudia as she walked down a flight of stairs wearing a strapless ivory dress and a tiara in front of over 400 guests.

Despite the publicity, his second marriage was short-lived and ended, according to Uribe's mother, some three-and-a-half years before his death in 2014.

== Death ==
Uribe was hospitalized on 2 May 2014 after suffering several cardiac arrhythmias and liver failure. He died on 26 May 2014 at age 48 from liver failure. After his death, his body was cremated and an urn with his ashes was kept by his mother.

== See also ==
- List of heaviest people
- Obesity
