= Wesley Warren Jr. =

American with scrotal elephantiasis

Wesley Warren Jr. shortly after undergoing surgery on his testicles.

Wesley Warren Jr (June 23, 1963 – March 14, 2014) was an American man who attracted worldwide attention for his problems with scrotal elephantiasis, which caused his scrotum to grow to a weight of 132.5 pounds (60.1 kg) and hang down a little below his knees. After launching a campaign to raise the money for an operation to resolve the problem, for which he raised only $2,000, he underwent surgery in April 2013 after visiting Dr. Joel Gelman of the University of California, Irvine's Center for Reconstructive Urology, who was aware that Warren could not afford the surgery and so performed it for free. Warren's struggles with his condition and his subsequent operation were filmed by a British television crew for a documentary The Man with the 10-Stone Testicles, which aired on Channel 4 in the United Kingdom on June 24, 2013. He died of complications from diabetes on March 14, 2014.

== Onset of Warren's condition ==
Born in Orange, New Jersey, on June 23, 1963, Warren was a former resident of New York City, where he worked in security and as a messenger. He moved to Las Vegas in the 1990s and worked on commission to find locations for pay phones in the Las Vegas Valley. He fell ill in late 2008 and attributed the onset of his condition to accidentally striking his testicles while sleeping. He said: "I had never felt such pain. It was like a shooting pain through my entire body. When it stopped, it was like a huge tractor trailer went off the top of me. I think it ruined my lymph nodes down there". The following morning he found that his scrotum had swelled to "the size of a soccer ball".

Warren's condition was not unknown in the tropics, but is very rare in the United States. In tropical regions, it is caused by parasites that are spread by mosquitoes, causing an infection called lymphatic filariasis. Parasitic worms block the body's lymphatic system and cause fluids to collect, resulting in a swelling called lymphedema. In Warren's case, however, doctors found no trace of an infection and suggested that it may have resulted from trauma.

He underwent a two-week course of antibiotics, but this had little effect and a series of doctors, including a lymphedema specialist, were unable to find a solution. The swelling continued to grow to such a size that he became unable to work. In early 2010 he underwent an eight-week course of treatment at University Medical Center in Las Vegas. They were unable to determine the cause of the swelling, writing up 20 different documentations in the process. He was given multiple courses of antibiotics and anti-viral medications, which failed to resolve the condition.

The lymphedema had a severe effect on Warren's personal life and health. He already weighed 300 pounds (140 kg) before the onset of the condition and he had high blood pressure and asthma. The swelling increased his weight to about 450 pounds (200 kg). Because his penis and testicles were enclosed by his gigantic scrotum, he was unable to urinate normally or to have sex. Simply keeping his scrotum under cover was a challenge in itself, which he eventually solved by wearing an upside-down full-size hooded sweatshirt over it with his legs in the sleeves. Traveling on buses required him to bring along a milk crate and a cushion on which to rest his scrotum during the journey. As travel was so difficult, he would spend most of his time in his apartment's living room watching television while propping his scrotum on top of the milk crate.

Warren's doctor advised him to seek surgery on Medicaid, which would involve cutting away the swollen tissue and performing reconstructive surgery, including skin grafts to restore his penis and testicles. However, Warren was advised that they might have to be removed along with the tissue. This was not welcome news: "Basically, he was telling me there was a good chance that I would be castrated and have to go to the bathroom through a tube for the rest of my life. I really would like to have a relationship with a woman. I should be in the prime of my life right now."

== Fund-raising campaign ==
At a further evaluation at the Ronald Reagan UCLA Medical Center in California, he was advised that there was a better chance of saving his penis and testicles, but that the procedure would cost a seven-figure sum, which he did not have. In the hope of raising the money, he went public in a segment on Howard Stern's radio and TV show and set up an address to receive offers of help or financial support. He said: "I don't like being a freak, who would? But I figured that the Stern show is listened to by millions of people and they might want to help me. I hope some millionaire or billionaire will want to help me." He acknowledged that the choice of address was not the classiest, but it was at least memorable, and noted that The Howard Stern Show was a good platform for him to make an appearance as its audience is predominantly male.

Warren's appearance attracted widespread media interest. He was subsequently profiled by the Las Vegas Review-Journal's medical correspondent, Paul Harasim, in two pieces in the fall of 2011 that were viewed over a million times. He appeared on Comedy Central's Tosh.0 show in a sketch showing a skateboarder running into Warren's scrotum and being knocked down. A British documentary film-making company, Firecracker Films, signed a contract with him to make a documentary about his condition.

A month after the first Las Vegas Review-Journal story and The Howard Stern Show appearance, Warren had received $8,000 in donations via PayPal and an offer of help from The Dr. Oz Show. The show's producers offered him free surgery from Dr. Mehmet Oz in exchange for exclusive rights to his story. Warren declined, expressing fear that he would not survive the operation: "I'm not sure they are the best doctors. I might be castrated or bleed out on the operating table." Dr. Mulugeta Kassahun, a Las Vegas urologist who grew up in Ethiopia, where scrotal elephantiasis is more common, urged him to seek surgery soon despite the risks as the worsening condition posed an increasing risk to Warren's life. "An infection, a real concern with his condition, may well kill him," Kassahun told the Las Vegas Review-Journal. "If we have to do emergency surgery trying to save his life from infection, it won't be a surgery trying to save his testicles and penis." By this time, his scrotum was growing at a rate of 3 pounds (1.4 kg) per month.

== Corrective surgery ==
Warren was subsequently offered treatment in Greece by Dr. Emmanouil S.Z. Prokopakis, Head of Male Genito-urethral Plastic Surgery Unit at the IASO Group of Hospitals in Athens Greece, following a recommendation from James Lane, a former patient with scrotal elephantiasis who had been treated there. However, he was said to be "worried he's too big to get in the airplane bathroom for the flight." Dr. Joel Gelman of the University of California, Irvine's Center for Reconstructive Urology also offered to carry out the surgery and waive his normal fee if the use of the hospital's facilities was paid for by Nevada Medicaid. He told the Las Vegas Review-Journal that to date, he had "never lost a patient or a testicle."

The operation was carried out on April 8, 2013, by Gelman and three other surgeons who had donated their expertise. Warren's weight by this stage had increased to 552 pounds (250 kg) and his penis was buried 1 foot (30 cm) inside his testicle sac. The 13-hour operation required all four surgeons to cut away Warren's engorged scrotum simultaneously while carrying out skin grafts to cover Warren's newly exposed penis and testicles. Warren's severe anemia complicated the task and the surgeons discovered that some of the veins in the mass were as much as quarter of an inch (6 mm) wide. According to Gelman, "With the fluid and other tissues, I would say the total weight he was carrying around probably exceeded 160 pounds [72 kg]." The operation, which was recorded by a British film crew, was followed by a program of physical therapy which began a week afterwards. He was released from hospital in late April and was reportedly recuperating in nearby housing.

The operation went ahead, even though Gelman had not yet received authorization from Nevada Medicaid, as he felt that it was unfair to Warren to "endure a cancellation." Gelman was critical of Nevada Medicaid's stance, saying that it's "terrible that Nevada isn't handling this the right way. When there's no expertise in a state to handle something, it doesn't seem right that Nevada can't pay the hospital when the doctors work for free." He commented that he and the other surgeons had donated their expertise not only to help Warren, but to show to others with scrotal elephantiasis that something could be done for them as well. He was optimistic about Warren's future: "There are a lot of shows about makeovers, but this is a real makeover. He's basically a new man."

== Documentary ==
Firecracker Films' documentary film, titled The Man with the 10-Stone Testicles, was aired on the British television network Channel 4 on June 24, 2013, as part of their anthology series Body Shock.

The film received mixed reviews from the British media. The Daily Mirror's Kevin O'Sullivan commented that Channel 4's "deep sleaze divers" were responsible for scheduling the documentary and that the channel was "the home of shameless voyeurism", while a psychologist interviewed by Metro said that it "appeals to our voyeuristic tendencies – there's something a bit titillating about peeking into the very private aspects of other people's lives and when those people happen to be afflicted by problems that we don't have ourselves, it gives us some emotional distance ... But because so few are affected by medical conditions like elephantiasis, it somehow becomes acceptable to be so personal and almost invasive." However, Metro's TV critic Keith Watson commented that "beneath the freak show facade ... there was a rather inspiring story of human fortitude in the face of outlandish bad luck", while Grace Dent of The Independent similarly felt that there were "subtler ideas present", calling it "an unflinching look at the reality of today's American healthcare system." Alex Harvey of The Times wrote that the film told Wesley's story "with compassion and detail". The Guardian's Stuart Heritage felt that it "just fell on the right side of exploitation ... We got to see the man, and experience his pain and worries and embarrassment. It sounded like a car crash, but it turned out to be relatively sensitive to the subject."

It also proved to be a ratings hit, with nearly 4 million viewers and up to 13% of audience share over its two time slots – 3.05 million (13.3%) at 9 p.m. and 818,000 (4.6%) at 10 p.m. It was the sixth most-tweeted broadcast of the week June 24–30, recording 76,636 tweets and peaking at 1,923 per minute. Sue Oriel of Firecracker Films told the Metro that it had got "the entire [United Kingdom] talking" and said: "Every once in a while a programme comes along that just blows an audience away. This is one of those shows."

The documentary was picked up by TLC for a premiere in the United States, airing on August 19, 2013, under the title The Man with the 132 lb Scrotum. In Australia it was aired on Seven Network on September 25, 2013, under the title of The Man with the Biggest Testicles and was replayed on 7mate on October 1, 2013, and on Seven Network on March 20, 2014, following Wesley's death.

== Death ==
Wesley Warren Jr. died at the University Medical Center of Southern Nevada on March 14, 2014, at the age of 50; a friend of Warren stated that he had been at the University Medical Center of Southern Nevada for five and a half weeks, and had had multiple heart attacks. His death was not tied to his reconstructive surgeries.
