= Bob Smith (halfback) =

American football player (1933–2014)

No. 43
- Position: Halfback

Personal information
- Born: February 23, 1933; Council Bluffs, Iowa, U.S.
- Died: September 28, 2014 (aged 81); Pueblo, Colorado, U.S.
- Listed height: 5 ft 10 in (1.78 m)
- Listed weight: 195 lb (88 kg)

Career information
- High school: Grand Island (Grand Island, Nebraska)
- College: Nebraska (1951–1954)
- NFL draft: 1955: 15th round, 181st overall pick

Career history
- Cleveland Browns (1955–1956); Philadelphia Eagles (1956)

Awards and highlights
- NFL champion (1955); First-team All-Big Seven (1954)

Career NFL statistics
- Rushing yards: 160
- Rushing average: 3.3
- Receptions: 2
- Receiving yards: 12
- Total touchdowns: 1
- Stats at Pro Football Reference

Robert Gerald Smith (February 23, 1933 – September 28, 2014) was an American professional football halfback who played two seasons in the National Football League (NFL) with the Cleveland Browns and Philadelphia Eagles. He was selected by the Browns in the fifteenth round of the 1955 NFL draft after playing college football at the University of Nebraska–Lincoln.

== Early life and college ==
Robert Gerald Smith was born on February 23, 1933, in Council Bluffs, Iowa. He attended Grand Island Senior High School in Grand Island, Nebraska.

He was a four-year letterman for the Nebraska Cornhuskers from 1951 to 1954. He was named first-team All-Big Seven Conference by the Associated Press his senior year in 1954.

== Professional career ==
Smith was selected by the Cleveland Browns in the 15th round, with the 181st overall pick, of the 1955 NFL draft. He played in ten games for the Browns during the 1955 season, totaling 37 carries 142 yards and one touchdown, two catches for 12 yards, 13 kick returns for 320 yards, one fumble, and two fumble recoveries. He also played in the 1955 NFL Championship Game, rushing three times for two yards and returning two kicks for 41 yards in a 38–14 victory over the Los Angeles Rams. He appeared in two games for the Browns in 1956, rushing two times for 10 yards, before being released on October 19, 1956.

Smith signed with the Philadelphia Eagles on October 23, 1956. He played in four games for the team during the 1956 season, recording nine rushing attempts for eight yards. He was released by the Eagles on November 20, 1956.

== Personal life ==
Smith was later a teacher and contractor in Pueblo, Colorado. He died on September 28, 2014, in Pueblo.
