= Carl Thompson (obese man) =

Former heaviest man in the United Kingdom (1981–2015)

Thompson in his youth

Carl Thompson (1981 – 21 June 2015) was the heaviest man in the United Kingdom, weighing 413 kg (65 st 1 lb; 911 lb) at the time of his death.

== Biography ==
Thompson, of Dover, Kent, was eating heavily at the age of three or four years, sneaking downstairs and eating from the cupboards. At the same age, he took food from his neighbour's freezer. He attended Harbour Specialist School in Dover.

In 2012, his 54-year-old mother died of brain cancer and Thompson said that depression led him to increase his weight from 35 to 65 stone (490 to 910 lb; 220 to 410 kg). He consumed 10,000 calories a day, four times his recommended intake. His food cost £200 per week, including paying takeaway owners to let themselves into his flat to deliver meals to his bed, using spare keys he had made for them.

Thompson could not wear clothes. He last left his flat on crutches on his birthday in 2014, when he weighed 56 stone (780 lb; 360 kg).

In his last year, Thompson was alone and entirely bedridden. He had twice-daily visits from carers to dress and bathe him. He also suffered five heart attacks. Thompson refused a gastric band and said he intended to diet and exercise; doctors told him he must reduce his weight to 20 stone (280 lb; 130 kg) to survive.

In April 2015, he appeared via video link on the ITV show This Morning, where Dr. Dawn Harper told him that he was suffering from other people's kindness. Thompson said that he used his weight to tell others not to follow his example. After the television appearance he received support from local people, including someone who sent him healthier meals.

== Death ==
Kent Police were informed of Thompson's death at 10:38 a.m. on 21 June 2015 at 33 years old. It took six hours (including time taken to remove a wall) for three undertakers, two police officers and firemen to remove his body.

== See also ==
- List of heaviest people
