= Jon Brower Minnoch =

Heaviest ever recorded human (1941–1983)

- Born: September 29, 1941; Seattle, Washington, U.S.
- Died: September 4, 1983 (aged 41); Seattle, Washington, U.S.
- Burial place: Mount Pleasant Cemetery, King County, Washington; 47.64328°N 122.36626°W
- Education: Bothell High School
- Occupation: Taxi driver
- Known for: Heaviest person ever recorded (1,400 lb or 635 kg or 100 st)
- Height: 6 ft 1 in (185 cm)
- Spouses: Carolyn Jean McArdle (Note: McArdle preferred to be called Jean.) (m. 1963; div. 1980) Shirley Ann Griffin (m. 1982)
- Children: 2

Jon Brower Minnoch (September 29, 1941 – September 4, 1983) was an American man who is reported as the heaviest recorded human in history, weighing approximately 1,400 lb (635 kilograms; 100 stone) at his peak. (Note: While Minnoch was the heaviest person in history, Robert Earl Hughes (1926–1958) holds the record, according to Guinness World Records, for the largest "precisely measured weight for a human" at 1,069 lb (485 kilograms; 76.4 stone).) Obese since childhood, Minnoch normally weighed 800–900 lb (363–408 kilograms; 57–64 stone) during his adult years. He owned a taxi company and worked as a driver around his home in Bainbridge Island, Washington.

In an attempt to lose weight, Minnoch went on a 600 kcal (2,500 kJ) per day diet under a doctor's orders. As a result, Minnoch was bedridden for about three weeks before finally agreeing to go to a hospital in March 1978. It took over a dozen firefighters to transport him to the University of Washington Medical Center in Seattle. Doctors diagnosed Minnoch with a massive edema, and an endocrinologist estimated his weight to be approximately 1,400 lb (635 kilograms; 100 stone). His physicians placed him on a 1,200 kcal (5,000 kJ) per day diet where, after around two years in the hospital, he lost over 900 lb (408 kg; 64 st)—the largest documented human weight loss at the time. (Note: This record was surpassed by the Saudi Arabian man Khalid bin Mohsen Shaari, who lost 1,203 lb (546 kilograms; 86 stone) between 2014 and 2021.) After leaving the hospital, Minnoch regained much of the weight and died in September 1983, weighing nearly 800 lb (363 kg; 57 st) at his death. Minnoch's casket took up two burial spots at Mount Pleasant Cemetery in Seattle.

== Life ==
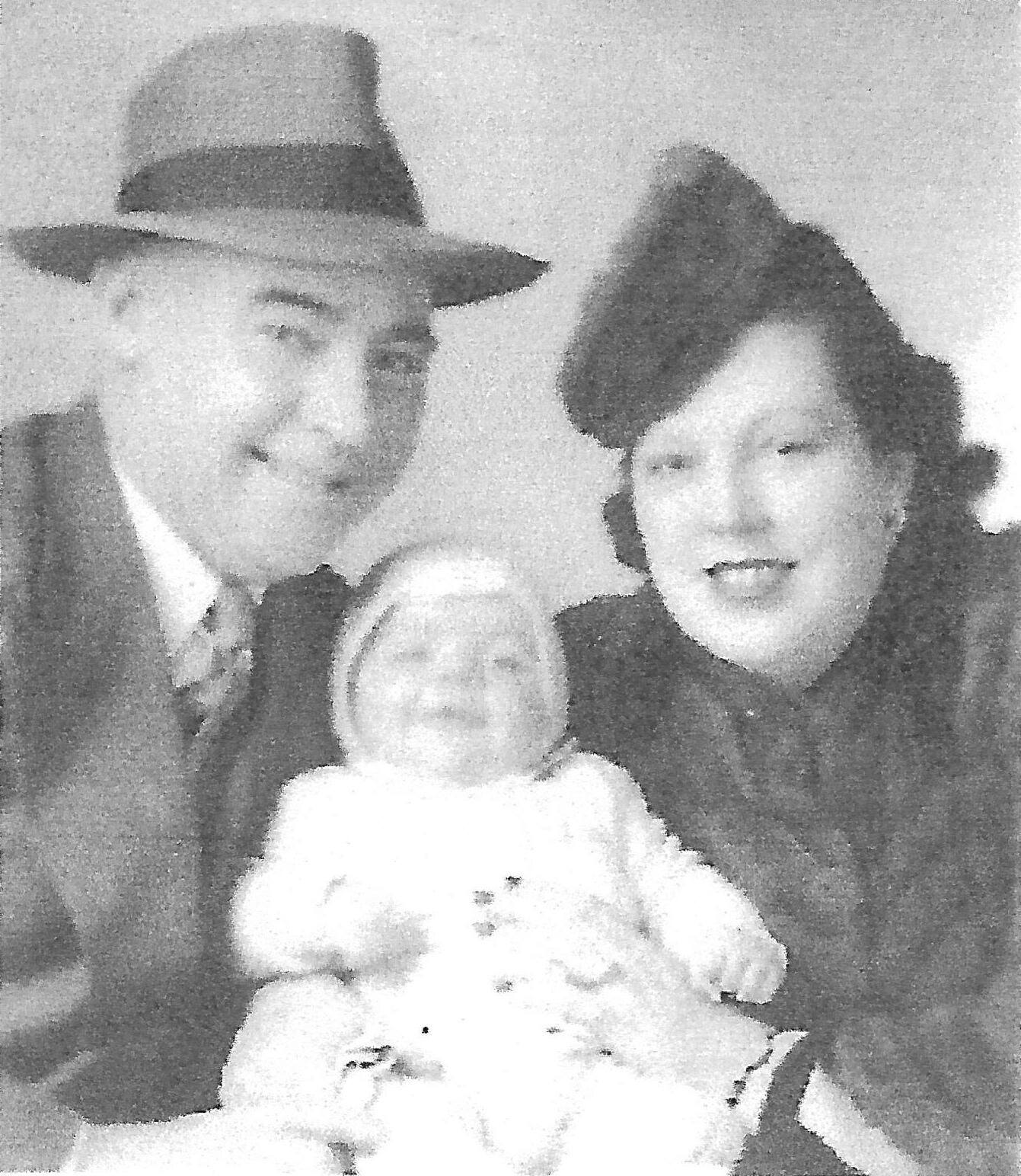
Minnoch as an infant with his parents

=== Early and personal life ===
Minnoch was born in 1941 in Seattle, Washington, to John Minnoch and June (née Brower). He weighed approximately 7 lb (3 kg) at birth. When Minnoch was an infant, his parents moved from Seattle to an apartment at a Bellingham hotel. He was an only child. Minnoch's father worked as a machinist and died of a heart attack in 1962. Minnoch's mother was a graduate of Seattle Pacific University and worked as a registered nurse at Providence Hospital and later as a telephone operator. June died in 1986, three years after her son. Minnoch's grandfather, Peter, was born in Scotland and emigrated to Ogden City, Utah, in 1876 with the Latter-Day Saints movement.

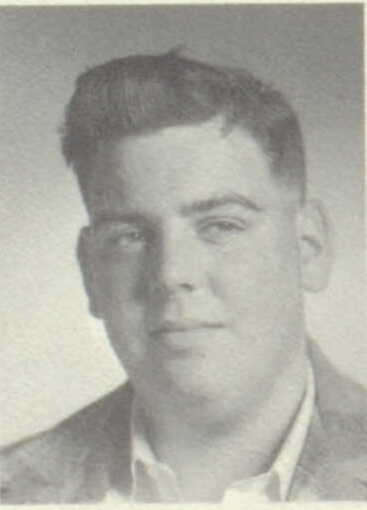
Minnoch in Bothell High School's 1958 senior yearbook

Minnoch suffered from obesity since childhood. At the age of 12, he weighed 294 lb (133 kg; 21.0 st). By age 22, he weighed 392 lb (178 kg; 28.0 st) and became 700 lb (320 kg; 50 st) in 1963. Minnoch usually weighed 800–900 lb (363–408 kg; 57–64 st) and stood 6 ft 1 in (1.85 m) in height. He had a body fat percentage of about 80%. Minnoch said water retention was the primary cause of his obesity. British obesity specialist David Haslam contends Minnoch's water retention was a consequence of his severe weight, not the cause of it.

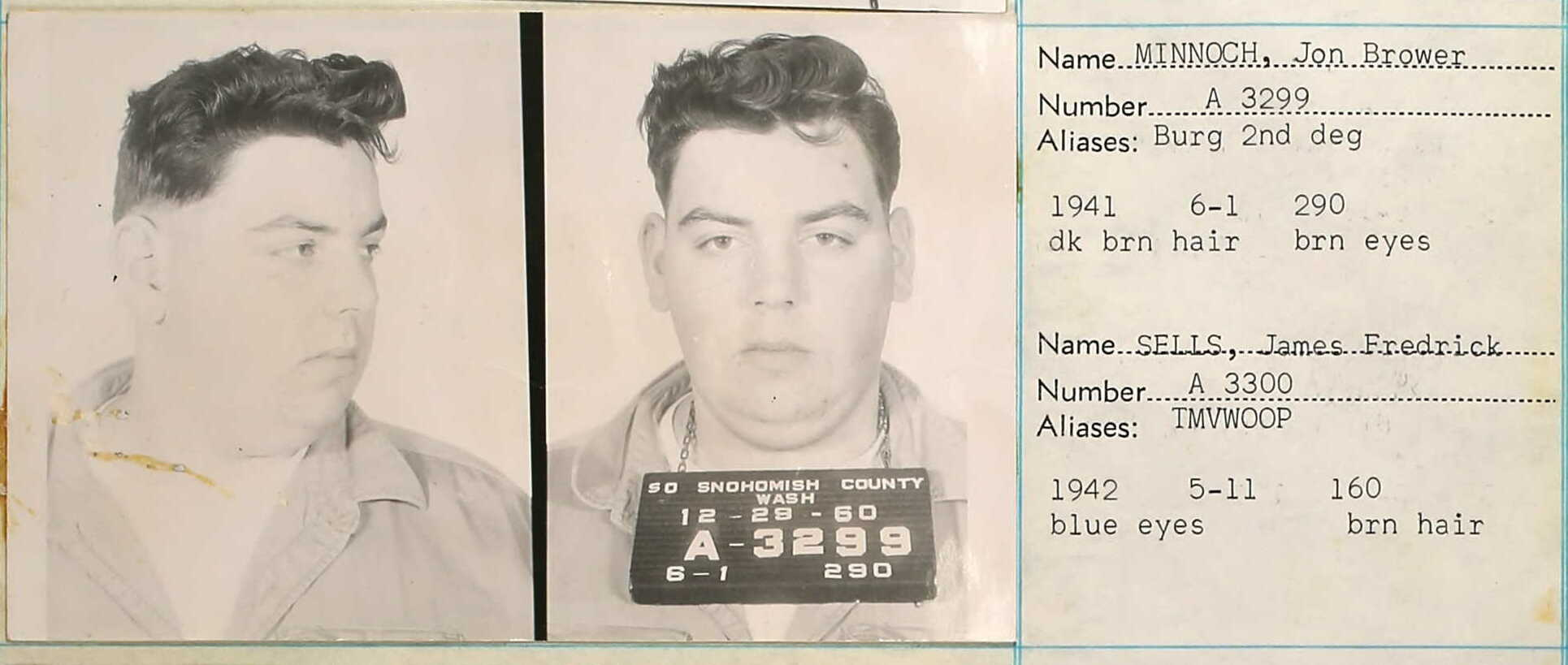
Jon Minnoch's mugshot after committing 2nd-degree burglary

Despite his condition, Minnoch tried to live a conventional life and stated that he was "in no way handicapped". He attended Bothell High School and drove taxi cabs for 17 years. On December 29, 1960, Minnoch committed second-degree burglary. He married his wife, Jean McArdle, in 1963. The couple operated the Bainbridge Island Taxi Co. together, the only cab company on the island at the time. According to a friend, Minnoch had a reputation as a "warm and funny family man" on the island. In March 1978, Minnoch weighed 12 times his 110 lb (50 kg; 8 st) wife, breaking the record for the greatest weight disparity between a married couple. Minnoch and McArdle divorced in 1980 and he married Shirley Ann Griffin in 1982. He fathered two sons, John and Jason.

=== Hospitalizations and death ===
Minnoch eventually "got so tired" of being heavy that he decided to cut his food intake to "almost nothing". Under a doctor's prescription, he went on a 600-calorie-a-day diet of only vegetables. He also took large doses of a diuretic that failed to eliminate excess fluid in his body. After about three weeks of weakness and being bedridden, he listened to his wife's pleas to enter a hospital. Minnoch was admitted to the University of Washington Medical Center in Seattle in March 1978, suffering from heart and respiratory failure. Firefighters were forced to remove a window at his home and place him on a thick piece of plywood. Minnoch was unable to move or speak. It took over a dozen firemen, rescue personnel, and a specially modified stretcher to transport him to the hospital. There, he was placed on two beds pushed together, and it took thirteen attendants to roll him over.

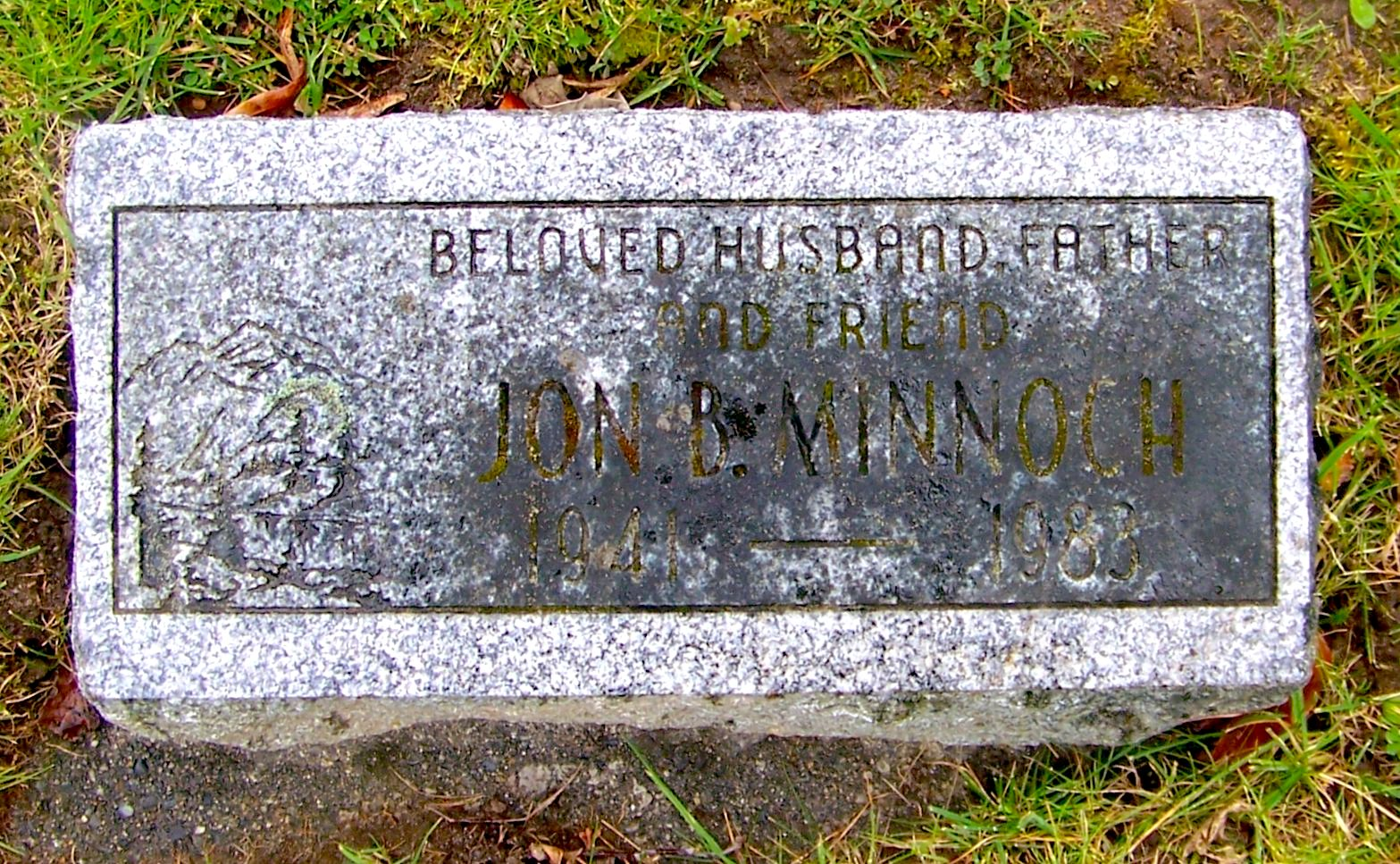
Minnoch's tombstone. His epitaph reads: "Beloved Husband, Father and Friend".

At the hospital, Minnoch was diagnosed with a massive edema, a condition in which the body accumulates excess extracellular fluid. Due to his poor health, measuring his weight with a scale was impossible. However, endocrinologist Robert Schwartz estimated his weight to be about 1,400 lb (635 kilograms; 100 stone). According to Schwartz, he was "probably more than that. He was by at least 300 pounds the heaviest person ever reported", and "probably the most unusual thing about [Minnoch's] case was that he lived". He reached a peak body mass index of 186 kg/m^{2} and spent several days on a respirator. In April 1978, his doctors described his medical state as "critical". Schwartz said Minnoch displayed symptoms of Pickwickian syndrome, where insufficient breathing causes one's level of carbon dioxide in the bloodstream to rise.

Minnoch remained in the hospital for two years and was put on a diet of 1,200 kcal (5,000 kJ) per day. When discharged from the hospital, he weighed 476 lb (216 kg; 34 st), having lost 924 lb (419 kg; 66 st), the largest human weight loss ever documented at the time. He hoped to eventually reach a weight of about 210 lb (95 kilograms; 15 stone), stating, "I've waited 37 years to get this chance at a new life". Despite this, he soon started to gain weight again. He was readmitted to the hospital just over a year later in October 1981, after his weight increased to 952 lb (432 kg; 68 st); he had managed to gain 200 lb (91 kg; 14 st) in just seven days. He died 23 months later on September 4, 1983, aged 41. At the time of his death, he weighed 798 lb (362 kg; 57 st). According to his death certificate, Minnoch's immediate cause of death was cardiac arrest, with respiratory failure and restrictive lung disease as contributing factors. He was buried in a wooden casket made of plywood 3/4 inch (19.1 mm) thick and lined with cloth. The coffin took up two cemetery plots, and around 11 men were needed to transport his casket to his burial place at Mount Pleasant Cemetery.

== See also ==
- Daniel Lambert
- Epidemiology of obesity

== Notes ==
Preceded by Francis John Lang	Heaviest person ever recorded 1941–1983	Succeeded by None
