= Walter Hudson =

World's heaviest person

- Born: June 5, 1944; Brooklyn, New York, U.S.
- Died: December 24, 1991 (aged 47); Hempstead, New York, U.S.
- Known for: Former heaviest person alive

Walter Hudson (June 5, 1944 – December 24, 1991) was an American man and the holder of the Guinness World Record for the largest waist circumference, at 119 inches (302 cm) around. At his heaviest in September 1987, he weighed 1,197 pounds (543 kg), making him the heaviest person alive at the time, and the sixth heaviest person in medical history.

== Biography ==
=== Early life ===
Hudson was born on June 5, 1944 in Brooklyn, New York City. His father left the family when he was a baby. He was a compulsive eater growing up, and he weighed 125 pounds (57 kg) by the time he was 6 years old. He would often leave home early on the way to school just to eat extra food, collect recyclables for change to buy candy bars, and routinely eat late at night. He dropped out of school in the 7th grade after breaking his leg, eventually earning his high school diploma via a tutor. Around age 15, weighing 350 pounds (160 kg), he became permanently homebound. Hudson and his family moved from Brooklyn to Hempstead, New York on Long Island when he was 25.

=== Obesity ===
While living in Hempstead, Hudson shared a house with his mother, his brother George, his sister Barbara, and her children. He never went outside his home, both due to strong agoraphobia and the difficulty caused by his weight. He stayed in a queen-sized bed all day, only leaving to go to the bathroom, ate food prepared and served to him by his family members, and kept himself occupied by reading the Bible daily. His mother died in 1984. In September 1987, Hudson fell and became stuck in the doorway to his bedroom. His family members were unable to remove him, and the Hempstead Fire Department worked for four hours to cut the doorframe and extricate him. Afterwards, he decided to go on a diet with the assistance of comedian-turned-health activist Dick Gregory. When Gregory's professionals attempted to weigh Hudson, a team of weightlifters had to carry him onto the scale; he overloaded the scale's 1,000 lb (450 kg) limit, and his weight was estimated at 1,200 pounds (540 kg). The Guinness Book of World Records officially recorded his peak weight at 1,197 pounds (543 kg), with a waist circumference of 119 inches (300 cm), the widest ever recorded; this also made him the heaviest person alive since the death of Jon Brower Minnoch and the second-heaviest person of all time.

After a year of dieting under Gregory's supervision, Hudson weighed 520 pounds (240 kg) in September 1988, indicating a weight loss of nearly 680 pounds (310 kg). He also left his home under his own power for the first time in 18 years. Gregory discontinued his assistance shortly after, citing Hudson's fear of leaving his home as a major impediment to further treatment; other reports suggest it was due to tension between Hudson's family and Gregory's team of live-in care professionals staying in their home. In 1989, a bronchial infection disrupted Hudson's diet and exercise routine, causing him to relapse and regain nearly 200 pounds (91 kg).

Inspired by his difficulty finding clothes that fit him, Hudson started a mail order plus-sized clothing company named Walter Hudson Ventures in 1989 in partnership with a woman named Alexis Blass. It included a women's fashion line named "Invitation to the Dance," which Hudson described as aimed at women "from 200 to 1,000 pounds"; he also had plans to start a plus-sized men's clothing line. Hudson struck up a relationship with a customer of his named Sunday Cruz, and the two had become engaged by 1991.

=== Daily diet ===
Hudson described his typical daily diet to People magazine as consisting of two boxes of sausages, 1 pound (0.45 kg) of bacon, one dozen eggs, and a loaf of bread for breakfast; four Big Macs, four double cheeseburgers, and eight large portions of French fries for lunch; and three large ham steaks or two chickens, four baked potatoes, four sweet potatoes, and four heads of broccoli for dinner. Each meal would be accompanied by 6 US quarts (5.7 L) of soda and "the better part of a large cake" for dessert, plus snacks throughout the day. According to Jet magazine, Hudson's breakfast was one dozen eggs, one dozen rolls, and 2 pounds (0.91 kg) of bacon.

After enlisting Dick Gregory's help, Hudson was put on a strict 1,200 calorie vegetarian diet consisting of fruits, vegetables, Gregory's commercial powdered diet mix, orange juice, and 6 US quarts (5.7 L) of water.

== Death ==
Walter Hudson died of a heart attack at his home on December 24, 1991, at age 47. He had regained much of the weight he previously lost, and weighed 1,025 pounds (465 kg) at the time of his death. Emergency rescuers from the Hempstead Fire Department cut a 15-by-9-foot (4.6 by 2.7 m) hole in the bedroom wall to remove his body from the premises, and had to use a forklift to carry his body.

Hudson's funeral was held on January 2, 1992, at Gospel Blessing Center Church in Roosevelt, New York and was attended by over a thousand people, including his former nutritional advisor Dick Gregory. He was interred in Greenfield Cemetery in a custom-built coffin that was 54 inches (140 cm) wide, weighed more than 800 pounds (360 kg), and required eight pallbearers to move.

== See also ==
- List of the heaviest people
- Jon Brower Minnoch
- Dick Gregory
- Obesity
