= Patrick Deuel =

One of the world's heaviest people

Patrick D. Deuel
- Born: Patrick Darren Deuel; March 28, 1962; Grand Island, Nebraska, U.S.
- Died: April 29, 2016 (aged 54); Kearney, Nebraska, U.S.
- Education: University of Nebraska–Lincoln
- Occupation: Restaurant Manager

Patrick Darren Deuel (March 28, 1962 – April 29, 2016) was an American individual known for being one of the heaviest people in the world. He was the subject of the documentary "Half Ton Man" in Channel 4's BodyShock series. In the documentary, Rosalie Bradford gave advice after achieving a record-breaking weight loss of 349 kg (769 lb).

== Early life ==
Patrick Deuel was born on March 28, 1962, in Grand Island, Nebraska, the child of James W. Deuel and Betty Jean Otte. Deuel was a Boy Scout and in 1976 received the Eagle Scout Award with three Eagle palms. He graduated in 1980 from Grand Island High School, having previously attended Trinity Lutheran School and Walnut Junior High.

After graduating high school, Deuel studied at Hastings College for one semester. After this, he went to the University of Nebraska–Lincoln. He became a restaurant manager.

== Obesity ==
At one point, Deuel had not left his house (in Valentine) for five years. He stood at 180.34 cm (5 ft 11 in), and weighed 486 kilograms (1,071 lb), at his peak. He was so large that half the house had to be cut out to extract him from his home. He was rushed to a hospital at Sioux Falls, South Dakota in an ambulance with extra-wide doors and a ramp-and-winch system that had to be dispatched from Denver. Despite being morbidly obese, Deuel was also malnourished because many of the calories he had consumed were from junk food. However, assisted by a gastric bypass surgery which followed his hospitalization, Deuel proceeded to lose more than 250 kilograms (550 lb).

== See also ==
- List of heaviest people
- Obesity
