= Huang Chuncai =

Chinese man with neurofibromatosis (born 1977)

Huang Chuncai (Chinese: 黃春才) (born 29 December 1977) is a Chinese man who became notable for being "China's Elephant man". He has an extreme case of neurofibromatosis, which caused such large tumors on his face that they had completely distorted his features.

Born and raised in a tiny village located in the southern parts of Hunan province, Huang is the eldest of three children, and was born into poverty. In addition to his parents, his family also consists of his brother, his sister and his nephew. His father earned money by selling noodles in the local market.

Huang's parents first noticed signs of his illness when he was four years old. He was taken to the hospital and was diagnosed with neurofibromatosis. However, the doctors advised against removing the tumors—an operation that Huang's parents were too poor to afford anyway—because they believed it to be too dangerous and would cost him his life.

Huang's tumor continued to grow, and although he began attending school when he was eight, he eventually left four years later, as he felt alienated by the other children, who called him the "elephant man". By the time he was 31, his tumor weighed 15 kg.

Around 2007, he caught the attention of the doctors at the Fuda Cancer Hospital in Guangzhou, who decided to try removing the tumor. In his first operation in July 2007 removed a 15 kg (33 lb.) tumor from the right side of his face, and the second one in January 2008 removed another 10 lb. (4.5 kg) of tissue from the same side.

A third operation was scheduled for late 2008, which would have removed the tumor on the left side of his face.

In the BodyShock series, Huang was the subject of a 2008 documentary episode entitled "I Am the Elephant Man".

In 2013, another three lbs were removed from his face.

Chuncai's surgeries were considered a success, and have helped decrease the size of his tumor to just 7 pounds. From the 25 kg tumor, 21 kg have been removed.

Chuncai reportedly had plans to earn money by helping his family sell noodles in the local market. He was expected to have two more operations, but there have been no new reports concerning further surgeries. Perhaps due to the serious risks involved, Chuncai decided not to schedule any more operations – at least for now.

As of 2017, Daily Star reported Chuncai was becoming accustomed to his appearance, and has been leading a relatively normal life after his four operations. He has also reportedly turned down offers to appear in "freak shows" in China.

== See also ==
- Joseph Merrick
