= Catrina Raiford =

American woman

Catrina Raiford is an American woman who was once considered to be the heaviest woman in the world, weighing 955 pounds (433 kg; 68.2 st) on a 5 ft 2 in (1.57 m) frame.

At age 14, she weighed close to 500 pounds (230 kg; 36 st). Her family placed her for eight months in a psychiatric home. As an adult, Raiford continued to gain weight. Unable to deal with her emotional issues, she eventually lost her job and moved back in with her mother.

Raiford became known as the 'Half Tonne Woman' before she lost half her body weight. She was inspired to do that in December 2003, when she had to be “bulldozed out of [her] house” after calling for help due to breathing difficulties. For five years until that point she had been bedridden.

It took Raiford three years to lose close to 300 pounds (140 kg; 21 st). Following that accomplishment in 2005 she became eligible for the gastric bypass surgery and has lost a total of close to 500 pounds (230 kg; 36 st).
