= Mayra Rosales =

American former heaviest living woman (1980–2024)

- Born: Mayra Lizbeth Rosales; November 6, 1980; La Joya, Texas, US
- Died: February 16, 2024 (aged 43); McAllen, Texas US
- Known for: Heaviest living woman recorded

Mayra Lizbeth Rosales (November 6, 1980 – February 16, 2024) was an American woman known for being, at one point, the heaviest living woman. At her heaviest, she weighed 470 kg (1,036 lb). She came to prominence in March 2008 when her sister was jailed for murdering her two-year-old nephew, a murder to which Rosales had originally falsely confessed. She decided to get her life back in order to get custody of her sister's children, who had no parents to take care of them at that time.

== Incident in 2008 ==
On March 18, 2008, in La Joya, Texas, Eliseo Rosales Jr. was taken to the hospital suffering from breathing difficulties and a serious head injury, from which he later died. His aunt, Mayra Lizbeth Rosales, was arrested on suspicion of murder. Rosales initially took responsibility for her nephew's death, claiming that she had fallen and accidentally crushed him when her right hand slipped, while trying to pick the child up. However, medical staff soon established that Eliseo had died from massive blunt force trauma, casting doubt on Rosales' confession. Jaime Lee Rosales, the child's mother and Mayra Rosales' sister, was also arrested on charges of causing injury to a child, and of failing to protect a child.

== Subsequent events and trial ==
During the run up to her trial, it was determined that Eliseo's injuries were inconsistent with Rosales falling on him and that he had died from head trauma after a severe beating. Rosales' physical immobility made it impossible for her to have inflicted the kind of injuries that killed Eliseo. At her trial for capital murder, Mayra Rosales revealed that she had made up her story to protect her sister, whom Rosales accused of both neglecting and regularly physically abusing Eliseo. In this particular instance, Jamie Lee had hit Eliseo with a hairbrush for refusing to eat. When paramedics arrived, Rosales agreed to take the blame for causing the injuries to her nephew. At that time, Rosales believed that her physical condition left her with no reason to live, and as such, imprisonment or even a death sentence would not be as great a loss as it would be to her sister, who had other children to care for.

When Mayra finally revealed the truth, her sister, Jamie Lee Rosales, fled the country. A private investigator contracted by an American media outlet during the creation of a documentary film about Mayra's case tracked Jaime Lee down to Veracruz, Mexico. She returned to Texas after 2 1/2 years of being on the run. She was sentenced to 15 years in prison for causing Eliseo's death. Jamie will be released in 2025.

== Later developments ==
In the wake of the death of her nephew and the revelation of her massive weight, Rosales became the subject of intense media attention. At this time, Rosales, who had not left her bed for 2 years, was reluctant to engage with the public. After her sister's arrest and conviction, Rosales expressed interest in taking custody of her sister's remaining children, but realized she was physically unable to care for them while bedridden. Numerous weight-loss specialists reached out with offers of help and support.

In 2012, the US television channel TLC aired a documentary entitled Half-Ton Killer? This was later also screened by UK broadcaster Channel 4, in which it was revealed that Rosales had received treatment from Dr. Younan Nowzaradan to help with her weight-related issues. She was shown being admitted to Nowzardan's Houston clinic, where, under medical supervision, she lost 32 stone (450 lb) in anticipation of receiving gastric bypass surgery.

In 2013, Rosales stated on the Spanish-language TV show Sábado Gigante that she had lost 800 pounds, and was now in a romantic relationship. She also appeared on Anderson Cooper in 2012 to discuss the changes that she had made. She also appeared on Dr. Oz.

Rosales lived a quiet life in Sullivan City, Texas. She was married to Carlos De La Rosa.

Rosales died from an illness on February 16, 2024 at the age of 43.
