= Ricky Naputi =

Heaviest man from Guam (1973–2012)

- Portrait of Naputi
- Born: Ricky Junior Naputi; June 20, 1973; Mangiao, Guam, US
- Died: November 10, 2012 (aged 39)
- Spouse: Cheryl

Ricky Junior Naputi (June 20, 1973 – November 10, 2012) was a Guamanian man who apparently died from overeating in his apartment in Mangilao, Guam, at 39 years old. He had struggled with his health since he was a teenager, which was when he developed an addiction to food, though he was an average-sized child. He weighed roughly 402 kg (900 lb) at his peak weight.

He was the target of the Channel 5 documentary The Man Who Ate Himself to Death and TLC followed him for their documentary 900 Pound Man: The Race Against Time. That documentary suggests the possibility of either suicide or foul-play as, when Cheryl, his wife, called emergency services, she said he had taken some pills and was not breathing. In the documentary, she admits that she told him she was leaving him because she was not in love with him anymore, and he became very upset. Given his weight and inability to leave his bed, the question of how he got the pills exists, and those pills are potentially the actual cause of death.

== See also ==
- List of the heaviest people
