= Robert Earl Hughes =

World's heaviest person able to walk without assistance

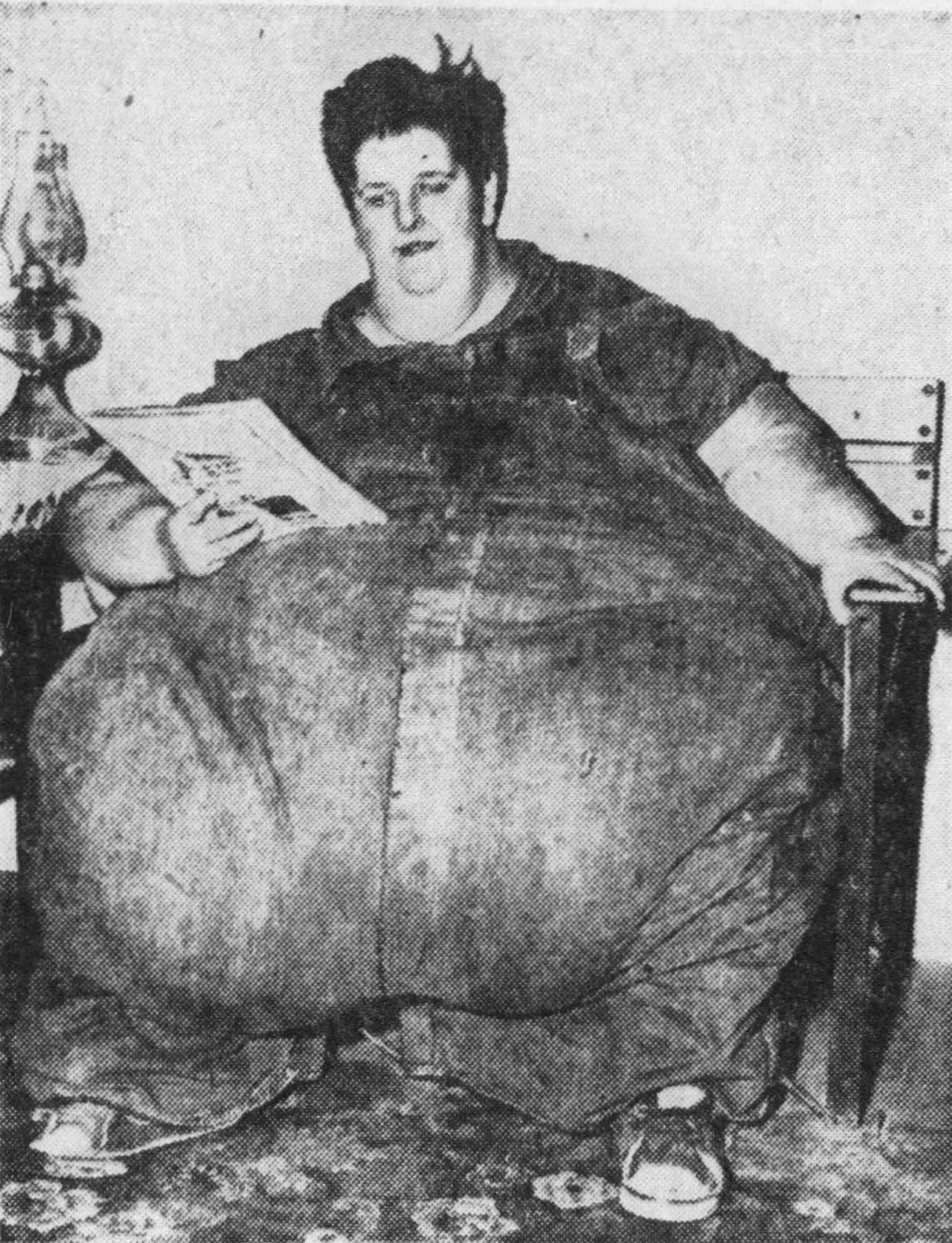
- Hughes in 1951
- Born: June 4, 1926; Monticello, Missouri, US
- Died: July 10, 1958 (aged 32); Bremen, Indiana, US
- Occupations: Entertainer and sideshow performer
- Known for: The heaviest human to walk unassisted, The heaviest human in the world during his lifetime

Robert Earl Hughes (June 4, 1926 – July 10, 1958) was an American man who was, during his lifetime, the heaviest human being recorded, weighing 1,071 pounds (486 kg). He remains the heaviest human in the world able to walk without the need of assistance.

== Early life and family ==
Robert Hughes was born on June 4, 1926, in Monticello, Missouri, the son of Abraham Guy Hughes (1878–1957) and Georgia Alice Weatharby (1906–1947). He was born "weighing a hefty but not abnormal" 11 pounds 4 ounces (5.1 kg) and was a "fairly average-size baby until he contracted whooping cough at about five months old."

The family moved to Fishhook, Illinois, when Robert was six months old.

== Career ==
Hughes made some income from selling photographs of himself. During his adult life, Hughes made guest appearances at carnivals and fairs. At age 27, he joined a traveling roadshow, often accompanied by some of his family. Plans to appear on The Ed Sullivan Show variety television program were announced but never materialized.

In 1957, traveling with his brother Guy and Guy's wife Lillian, Hughes had bookings throughout the country. Walking, even with his massive cane, had started to be difficult for the 31-year-old. While at a carnival, word reached Hughes that his father had died at age 79 back in Illinois. Guy and Lillian returned to Illinois for the funeral, but Robert stayed on, believing it was his duty to honor his commitments. At season's end, he returned to Guy's farm, unable to walk more than 20 feet (6.1 m) without the assistance of family members, who would follow closely, lugging a five-foot (1.5 m) wide, steel-reinforced chair in case of exhaustion.

== Death ==
While traveling with the roadshow in Nappanee, Indiana, Hughes developed a rash, and the flesh under his fingernails turned blue. Because he was unable to be moved to the nearest hospital in Bremen, Indiana, doctors treated him at his trailer, and determined he was suffering from measles. He developed uremia.

He died on July 10, 1958, at the age of 32. He was buried in a small church cemetery in Benville, Illinois, in Brown County near his hometown, Fishhook. About 2,000 people attended the funeral.

== See also ==
- List of the heaviest people
- Traveling carnival
