= Eugenia Martínez Vallejo =

Servant in the court of Charles II of Spain

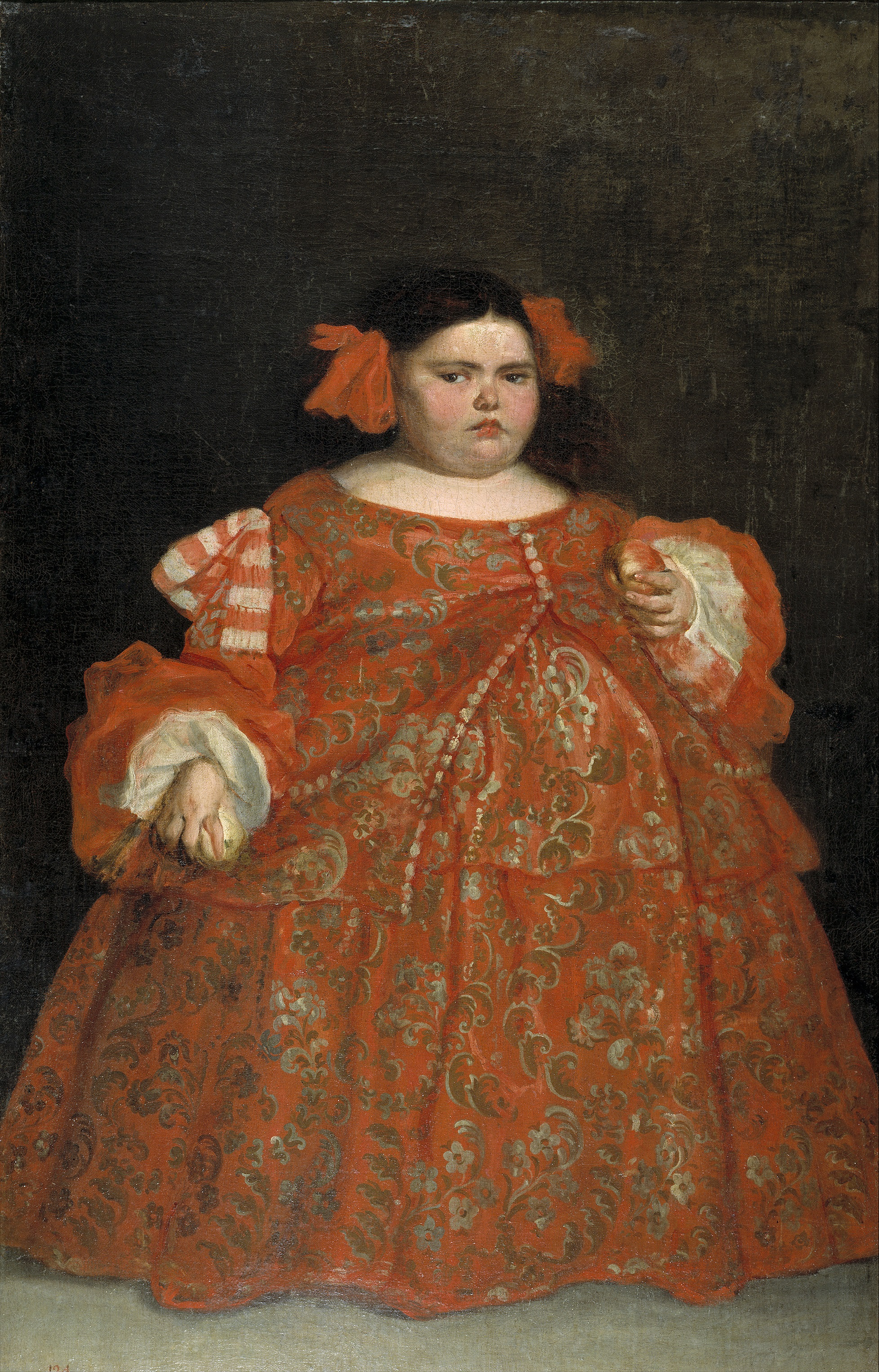
- "The Monster", dressed: Vallejo in 1680, as painted by Juan Carreño de Miranda
- Born: 1674; Merindad de Montija, Burgos, Spain
- Died: 1699 (aged 24–25)
- Known for: Subject of two portraits by Juan Carreño de Miranda

Eugenia Martínez Vallejo (1674–1699) was a Spanish court jester. She gained notoriety for her large size and weight, now thought to be the result of Prader–Willi syndrome.

== Biography ==
Vallejo was born in the small village of Merindad de Montija, Burgos, Spain in 1674, to Antonia de la Bodega and José Martínez Vallejo. Her parents were poor, and her mother gave birth to her at church after her water broke during Mass.

As an infant, Vallejo had a decent appetite, and any initial weight gain was thought to have been a good sign. Both medical and aesthetic standards of the age considered slightly heavier frames on women to be preferable. By the time she was a year old she had already reached 25 kg (55 lbs).

By the age of six, Vallejo weighed 70 kg (155 lbs). News of her condition had spread to Madrid, and it was at this age that she was summoned there to the court of Spanish regent Charles II in 1680. So fascinated was the king by her appearance that he got his court painter, Juan Carreño de Miranda, a noted Baroque portraitist, to create two full-body portraits of her: one clothed in formal dress and one undressed. The paintings are titled The Monster - Dressed and The Monster - Nude, respectively.

Within the court she fulfilled the functions of a jester, her appearance serving as a source of shock and amusement. This situation was not uncommon for people with significant physical deformities during that time. Many monarchs held disfigured and disabled people in the ranks of their courts, often exploiting them for entertainment. Despite her presence at court there are no records of financial accommodation given to her, and so it is likely that she was brought in only during certain events as entertainment.

Martínez Vallejo died aged 25 in 1699.

== Legacy ==
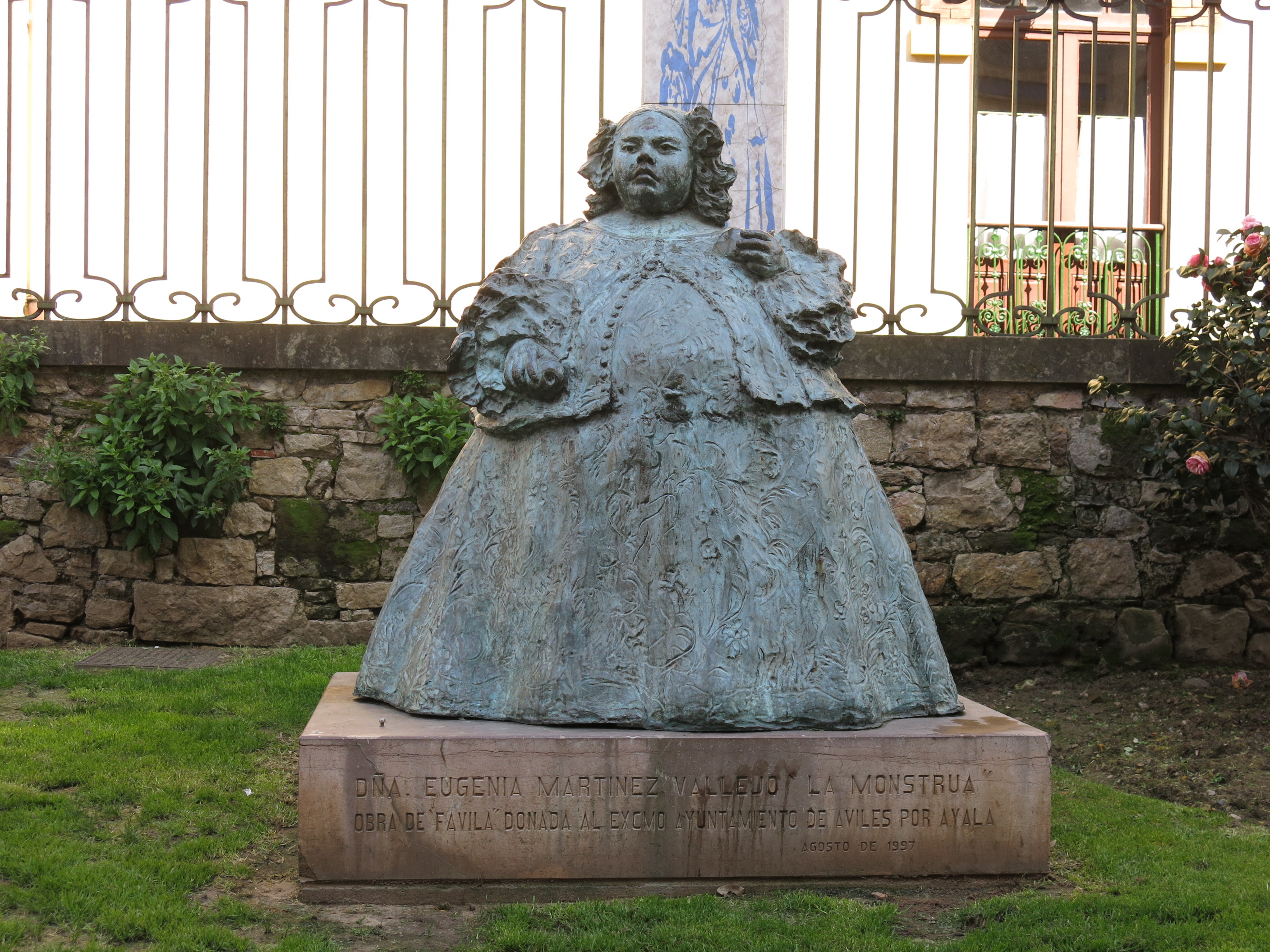
The statue of Martínez Vallejo by Amado González Hevia

The two portraits by Carreño are currently in the Museo del Prado in Madrid. In 1997 a sculpture by Amado González Hevia, also known as ‘Favila’, was commissioned for the city of Avilés. He created a bronze statue of Martínez Vallejo, based on the Carreño clothed portrait. It stands along Calle Carreño Miranda and is a popular tourist destination.
