= Paul Mason (obese man) =

Former heaviest man (born 1960)

Paul Jonathan Mason (born 1960) is an English man who is known for being one of the world's former heaviest men, weighing in at 444.521 kg (980 lb; 70 st) at his peak Mason was given a gastric bypass surgery in 2010, and lost an estimated 295 kg (650 lb; 46.5 st). He is the heaviest recorded person from the United Kingdom, a record which holds to this day.

Several years earlier he had applied to the National Health Service for gastric bypass surgery, to help him get his weight down. Mason applied several times and in the end waited 10 years before he was approved for surgery. In 2010, two years after beginning counseling, Mason finally had the surgery he desperately needed and wanted. Five years later, he had lost over 272 kg (600 lb; 42.8 st) and weighed around 159 kg (351 lb; 25.0 st). The surgical removal of 34–45 kg (75–99 lb; 5.4–7.1 st) of excess skin allowed for greater mobility, which made him able to exercise, and lose more weight. In 2014 he weighed 140 kg (310 lb; 22 st), a total weight loss of 304 kg (670 lb; 47.9 st). Mason had a further 22–27 kg (49–60 lb; 3.5–4.3 st) of loose skin removed at New York's Lenox Hill Hospital in May 2015. As of March 2017, Mason weighed 127 kg (280 lb; 20 st) and was living in a boarding house in the United States.

In 2018 he split with his girlfriend, after which he became addicted to food once again.

In May 2019 Mason revealed that he has almost doubled in size – from 275 lb (125 kg; 19.6 st) to over 500 lb (230 kg; 36 st).

== See also ==
- List of the heaviest people
