= Body Shock =

TV documentary series

- Genre: Documentary
- Country of origin: United Kingdom
- Original language: English

Production
- Running time: 49 minutes

Original release
- Network: Channel 4
- Release: 2003 – 2014

Body Shock (also: Bodyshock) is a British medical documentary series about the conditions or lives of extraordinary people. It was originally produced by redback for Channel 4 in the UK, but in September 2006, it was taken over by ArkMedia.

There have been three series since December 2003.

- The Boy Who Gave Birth to His Twin (Alamjan Nematilaev from Kazakhstan)
- Wild Child (Genie from the United States, episode was also titled Wild Child: The Story of Feral Children in the United States)
- Anatomy of a Shark Bite
- Riddle of the Elephant Man (Joseph Merrick from the United Kingdom)
- The Man Who Ate his Lover (Armin Meiwes from Germany)
- The Man Who Slept for 19 Years (Terry Wallis from the United States)
- Orgasmatron
- The Girl with X-Ray Eyes (Natasha Demkina from Saransk, Russia)
- Megatumour (Lucica Bunghez from Romania and Matt Peperell from England)
- When Anaesthesia Fails (Anesthetic awareness)
- The Curse of the Mermaid (Milagros Cerrón from Peru, who was born with Sirenomelia)
- Half Ton Man (Patrick Deuel from the United States)
- The 80-Year-old Children (The Hussein family from India)
- Born with Two Heads (Manar Maged from Egypt)
- The Boy in the Bubble (David Vetter from the United States)
- Kill Me to Cure Me (Brett Kehrer from the United States)
- World's Biggest Boy (Dzhambulat Khatokhov from Kabardino-Balkaria, Russia)
- Half Ton Mum
- The Girl with Eight Limbs (Lakshmi Tatma from Bihar, India)
- I am the Elephant Man (Huang Chuncai from China)
- The Girl with Two Faces (Lali Kumar from India)
- Half Ton Son (Billy Robbins from Houston, Texas, United States)
- Two Foot Tall Teen (Jyoti Amge, from Nagpur, India)
- Age 8 and Wanting a Sex Change
- The Girl Who Cries Blood (Twinkle Dwivedi from Lucknow, India)
- Our Daughter, the Mermaid (Shiloh Pepin from Maine)
- The Twins Who Share A Brain (Krista and Tatiana Hogan from Vernon, Canada)
- Dad's Having a Baby (Thomas and Scott Moore from California, US)
- The 27 Inch Man (Edwardo Hernandez)
- Turtle Boy
- World's Tallest Man (Sultan Kösen from Turkey)
- The Man with the 10-Stone Testicles (Wesley Warren, Jr. from the United States)
- The Girl who Never Ate (Tia McCarthy from the United Kingdom, who suffered from and received corrective surgery for Oesophageal atresia)
