= Dzhambulat Khatokhov =

Asian television personality

- Born: 24 September 1999; Terek, Kabardino-Balkaria, Russia
- Died: 29 December 2020 (aged 21)
- Known for: World's heaviest child

Dzhambulat Mikhaylovich Khatokhov (Russian: Джамбулат Михайлович Хатохов; 24 September 1999 – 29 December 2020) was the world's heaviest child in 2003, according to the Guinness Book of Records.

== Biography ==
At the age of eight, Dzhambik and his mother visited Japan to be part of a television programme, "Impossible", on Fuji Television. His mother, Nelya Kabardarkova denied all accusations of fuelling his growth and said she was encouraging Dzhambik's wish to become a sumo wrestler. Dzhambik also attended sumo battles. On 10 July 2003, he wrestled Georgy Bibilauri, another heavy boy in the Georgian capital Tbilisi. At that time he was nearly 4 years old and 56 kg (123 lb), and Georgy was 5 years old and weighed 50 kg (110 lb). Both periods took a few seconds, after Dzhambik fell to the ground. At age 7 he was 4 ft 3 and weighed 100 kg (220 lb) while his brother was double his age but less than half his weight. By the age of 9, Dzhambik weighed 146.1 kg (322 lb).

Doctors were unsure of the cause of his fast growth. In 2008, the British doctor Ian Campbell, one of the world's leading experts in obesity, visited Dzhambik and performed a series of tests on him at a Moscow clinic, where he was treated every year for his obesity. The tests showed that 9-year-old Dzhambik's bones were the size of an average 13-year-old boy. He was also tested for anabolic steroids, which can cause abnormal bone growth, but the results were negative. As shown on an episode of Body Shock, Campbell and other health care professionals urged Dzambik's mother to help the boy eat a better diet and lose weight to improve his health, but Nelya rejected their advice and insisted the boy was healthy and capable of becoming a sumo wrestler or other sportsman. In 2006, journalist Nick Paton Walsh wrote in The Guardian that Nelya demanded money in order for him to meet Dzambik; Walsh hesitated as such payments were against Guardian policy but eventually relented, paying £160 or about 8000 roubles.

Dzhambik's size earned him the nickname Sosruko after an ancient hero from local mythology. Sosruko was a giant, a fierce warrior who protected his people and embodied qualities people in the Caucasus greatly respect: strength and size. According to Nelya Kabardarkova, her son's grandfather was also known as a Bogatyr, a Russian word for a sort of gentle giant.

Dzhambik appeared on many Russian TV Shows, but gained world recognition through the UK Channel 4 series BodyShock in the episode "World's Biggest Boy" which aired on many TV channels around the world.

In August 2017 Dzhambulat weighed 230 kg and decided to lose weight. His goal was to lose up to 120 kg. By his 18th birthday, he had lost 54 kg and weighed 176 kg, achieving this together with the trainer Yusif Nurullaev. He said: "The trainer literally kept track of every portion of food I was about to eat. I photographed my plate with my phone before eating and sent it to Yusif. If I forgot to do this, it means that he believed that I ate more than allowed, and loaded me more during training session. This disciplined me a lot."

== Death ==
His death was announced on 29 December 2020. He was 21. No cause of death was given. It has been reported that he died due to kidney problems.

== Weight development ==
| Age | Weight | Weight of a ... |
|---|---|---|
| Birth | 2.9 kg / 6.4 lbs / 0.5 st | normal baby |
| 1 | 12.7 kg / 27 lbs / 2 st | 3 year old |
| 4 | 56 kg / 124 lbs / 8.8 st | 13 year old |
| 6 | 89.7 kg / 198 lbs / 14.1 st | grown man |
| 8 | 132.9 kg / 293 lbs / 20.9 st | |
| 9 | 146 kg / 322 lbs / 23 st | |
| 10 | 126 kg / 278 lbs / 19.8 st | |
| 12 | 175 kg / 389 lbs / 27.6 st 190 kg / 419 lbs / 29.9 st | |
| 16 | 226 kg / 498 lbs / 35.6 st | |
| 17 | 230 kg / 507 lbs / 36.2 st | |
| 18 | 176 kg / 388 lbs / 27.7 st | |

== External references ==
- YouTube channel by Dzhambulat Khatokhov
