= Adipose tissue =

Loose connective tissue composed mostly by adipocytes

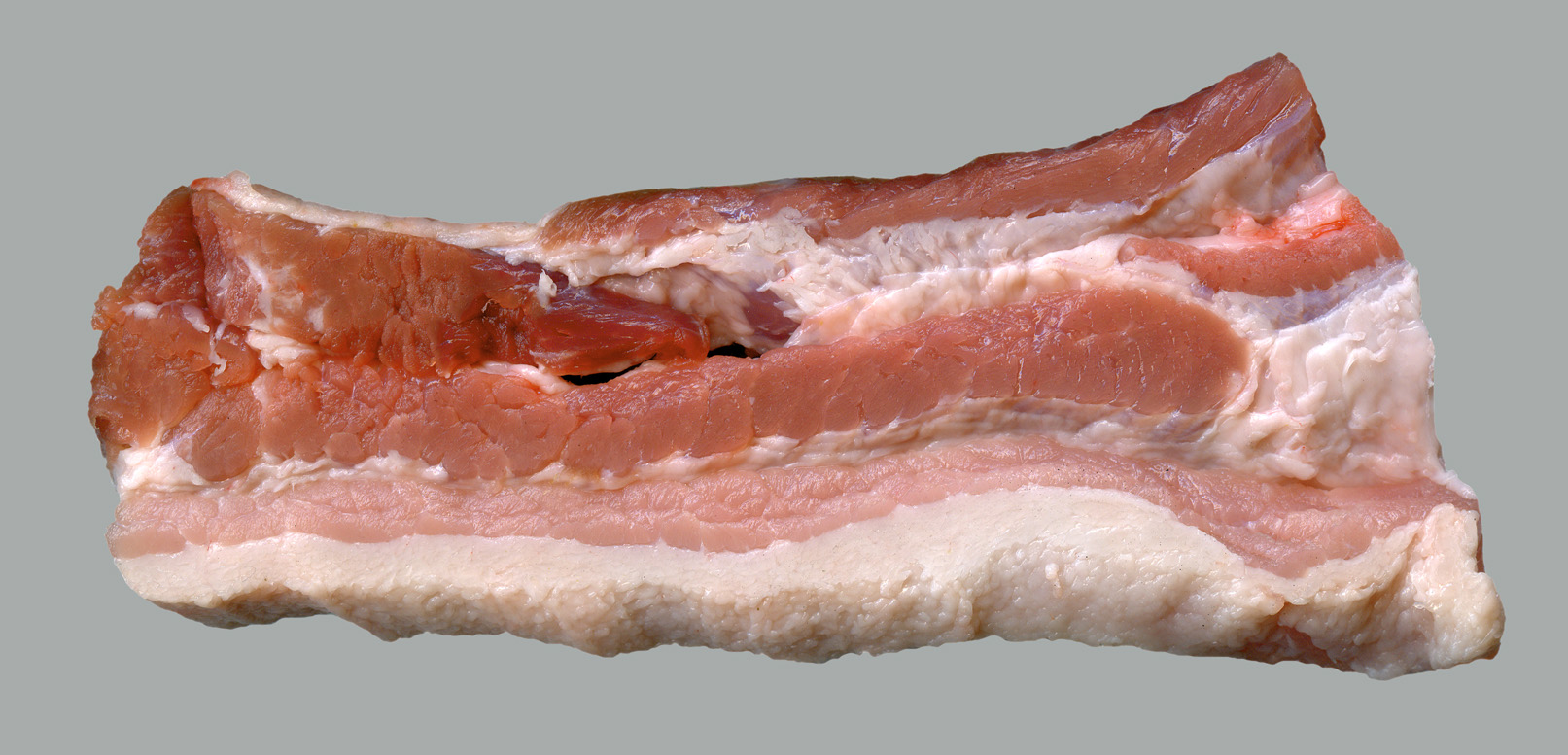
- Pig belly fat (white)

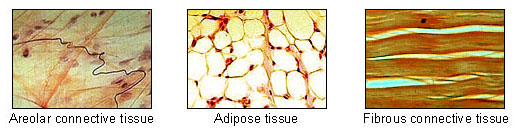
- Adipose tissue is one of the main types of connective tissue.
- Pronunciation: /ˈædɪˌpoʊs/

Identifiers
- MeSH: D000273
- FMA: 20110

Adipose tissue (also known as body fat or simply fat) is a loose connective tissue composed mostly of adipocytes. It also contains the stromal vascular fraction of cells including preadipocytes, fibroblasts, vascular endothelial cells and a variety of immune cells such as adipose tissue macrophages. Its main role is to store energy in the form of lipids, although it also cushions and insulates the body.

Previously treated as being hormonally inert, in recent years adipose tissue has been recognized as a major endocrine organ, as it produces hormones such as leptin, estrogen, resistin, and cytokines (especially TNFα). In obesity, adipose tissue is implicated in the chronic release of pro-inflammatory markers known as adipokines, which are responsible for the development of metabolic syndrome—a constellation of diseases including type 2 diabetes, cardiovascular disease and atherosclerosis.

Adipose tissue is derived from preadipocytes and its formation appears to be controlled in part by the adipose gene. The two types of adipose tissue are white adipose tissue (WAT), which stores energy, and brown adipose tissue (BAT), which generates body heat. Adipose tissue—more specifically brown adipose tissue—was first identified by the Swiss naturalist Conrad Gessner in 1551.

== Anatomical features ==
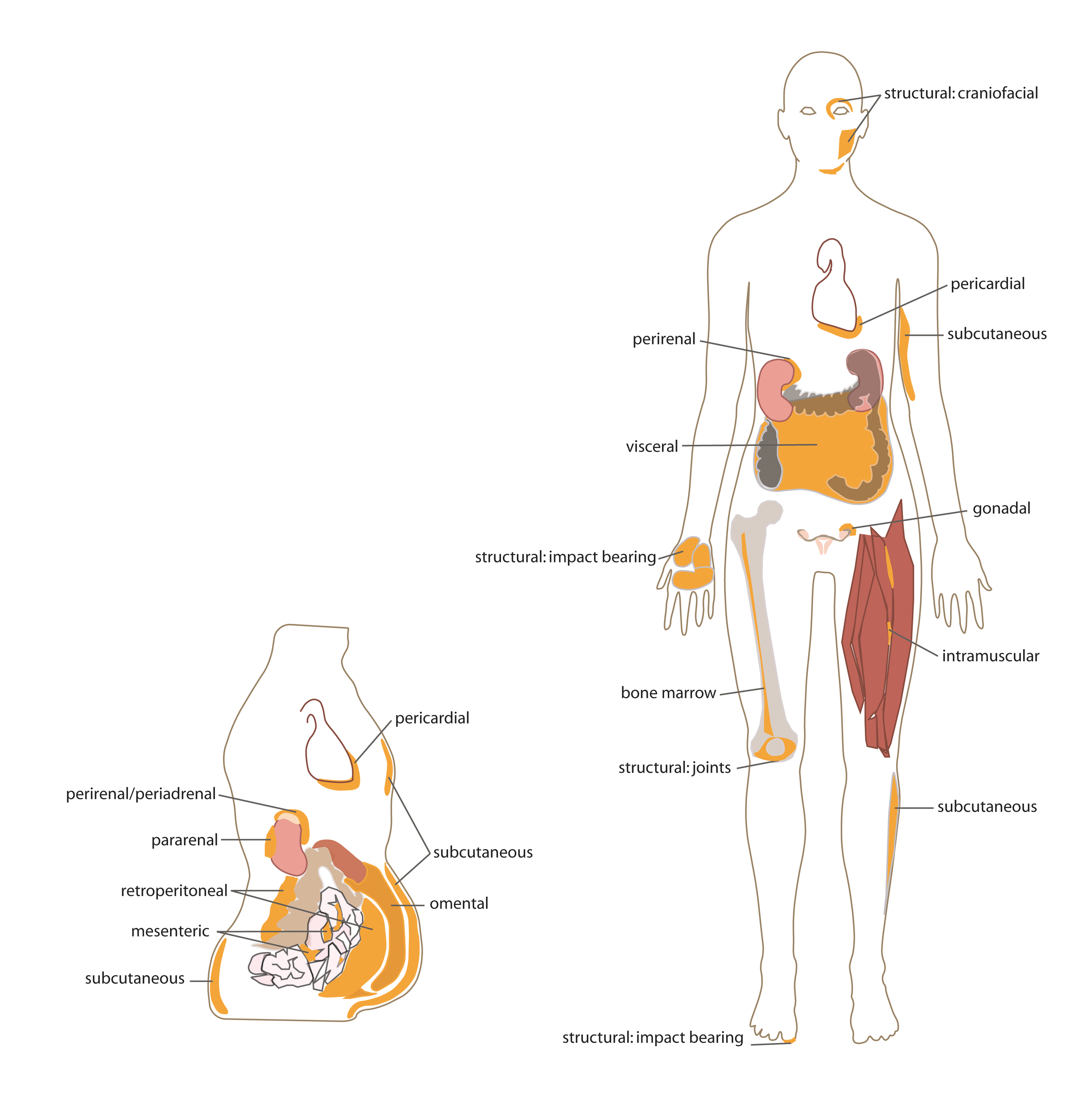
Distribution of white adipose in the human body

In humans, adipose tissue is located beneath the skin (subcutaneous fat), around internal organs (visceral fat), in bone marrow (yellow bone marrow), intermuscular (muscular system), and in the breast (breast tissue). Adipose tissue is found in specific locations, which are referred to as adipose depots. In addition to adipocytes, which comprise the highest percentage of cells within adipose tissue, other cell types are present, collectively termed stromal vascular fraction (SVF) of cells. SVF includes preadipocytes, fibroblasts, adipose tissue macrophages, and endothelial cells.

Adipose tissue contains many small blood vessels. In the integumentary system, which includes the skin, it accumulates in the deepest level, the subcutaneous layer, providing insulation from heat and cold. Around organs, it provides protective padding. However, its main function is to be a reserve of lipids, which can be oxidised to meet the energy needs of the body and to protect it from excess glucose by storing triglycerides produced by the liver from sugars, although some evidence suggests that most lipid synthesis from carbohydrates occurs in the adipose tissue itself. Adipose depots in different parts of the body have different biochemical profiles. Under normal conditions, it provides feedback for hunger and diet to the brain.

=== Obesity ===
In an obese person, excess adipose tissue hanging downward from the abdomen is referred to as a panniculus. A panniculus complicates surgery of the morbidly obese individual. It may remain as a literal "apron of skin" if a severely obese person loses large amounts of fat (a common result of gastric bypass surgery). Obesity is treated through exercises, diet, behavioral therapy, and liposuctions. Reconstructive surgery is one aspect of treatment.

=== Visceral fat ===
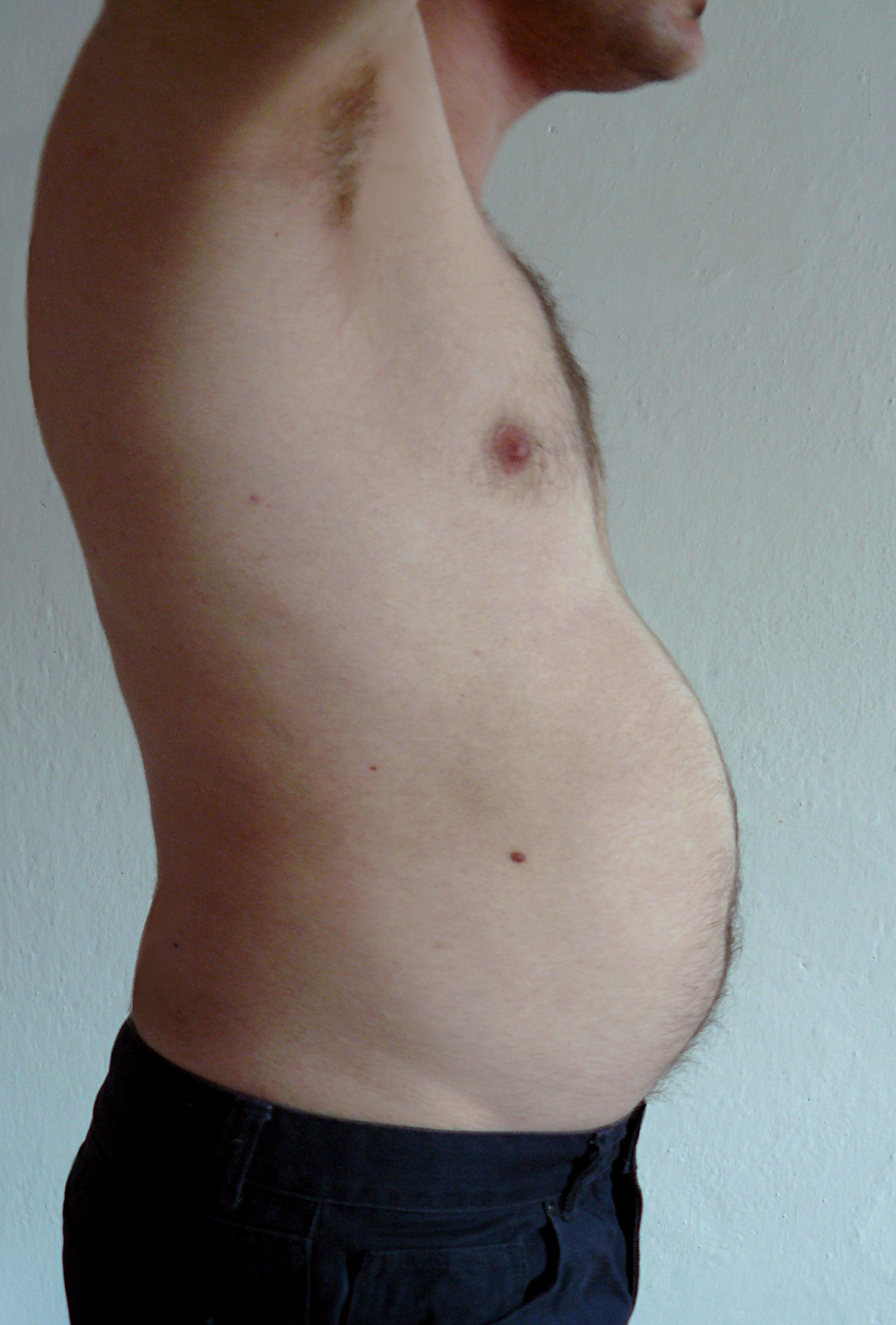
Abdominal obesity in a man ("beer belly")

Visceral fat or abdominal fat (also known as organ fat or intra-abdominal fat) is located inside the abdominal cavity, packed between the organs (stomach, liver, intestines, kidneys, etc.). Visceral fat is different from subcutaneous fat underneath the skin, and intramuscular fat interspersed in skeletal muscles. Fat in the lower body, as in thighs and buttocks, is subcutaneous and is not consistently spaced tissue, whereas fat in the abdomen is mostly visceral and semi-fluid. Visceral fat is composed of several adipose depots, including mesenteric, epididymal white adipose tissue (EWAT), and perirenal depots. Visceral fat is often expressed in terms of its area in cm^{2} (VFA, visceral fat area).

An excess of visceral fat is known as abdominal obesity, or "belly fat", in which the abdomen protrudes excessively. New developments such as the Body Volume Index (BVI) are specifically designed to measure abdominal volume and abdominal fat. Excess visceral fat is also linked to type 2 diabetes, insulin resistance, inflammatory diseases, and other obesity-related diseases. Likewise, the accumulation of neck fat (or cervical adipose tissue) has been shown to be associated with mortality. Several studies have suggested that visceral fat can be predicted from simple anthropometric measures, and predicts mortality more accurately than body mass index or waist circumference.

Men are more likely to have fat stored in the abdomen due to sex hormone differences. Estrogen (female sex hormone) causes fat to be stored in the buttocks, thighs, and hips in women. When women reach menopause and the estrogen produced by the ovaries declines, fat migrates from the buttocks, hips and thighs to the waist; later fat is stored in the abdomen.

Visceral fat can be caused by excess cortisol levels. At least 10 MET-hours per week of aerobic exercise leads to visceral fat reduction in those without metabolic-related disorders. Resistance training and caloric restriction also reduce visceral fat, although their effect may not be cumulative. Both exercise and hypocaloric diet cause loss of visceral fat, but exercise has a larger effect on visceral fat versus total fat. High-intensity exercise is one way to effectively reduce total abdominal fat. An energy-restricted diet combined with exercise will reduce total body fat and the ratio of visceral adipose tissue to subcutaneous adipose tissue, suggesting a preferential mobilization for visceral fat over subcutaneous fat.

==== Epicardial fat ====
Epicardial adipose tissue (EAT) is a particular form of visceral fat deposited around the heart and found to be a metabolically active organ that generates various bioactive molecules, which might significantly affect cardiac function. Marked component differences have been observed in comparing EAT with subcutaneous fat, suggesting a location-specific impact of stored fatty acids on adipocyte function and metabolism.

=== Subcutaneous fat ===
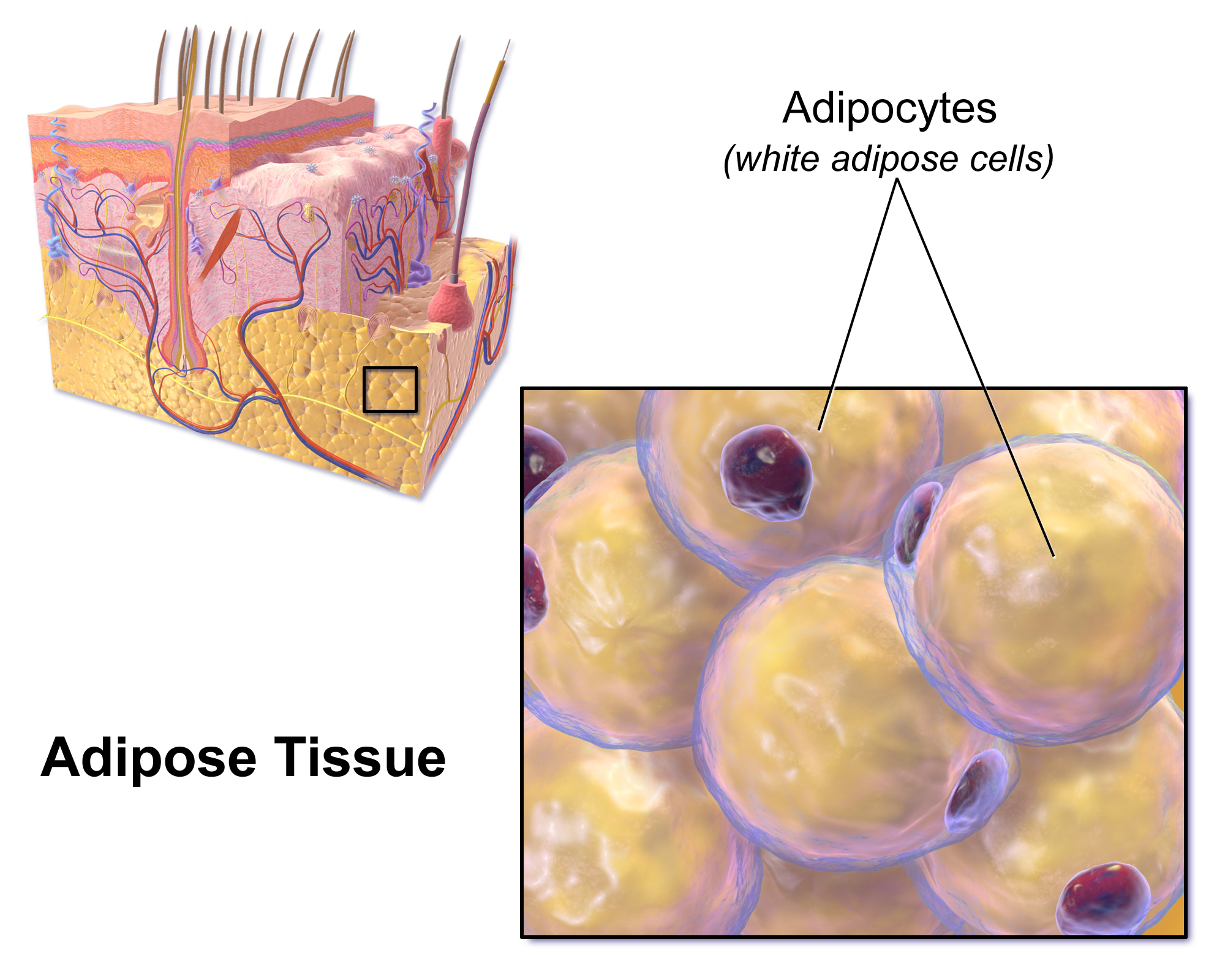
Micro-anatomy of subcutaneous fat

Most of the remaining nonvisceral fat is found just below the skin in a region called the hypodermis. This subcutaneous fat is not related to many of the classic obesity-related pathologies, such as heart disease, cancer, and stroke, and some evidence even suggests it might be protective. The typically female (or gynecoid) pattern of body fat distribution around the hips, thighs, and buttocks is subcutaneous fat, and therefore poses less of a health risk compared to visceral fat.

Like all other fat organs, subcutaneous fat is an active part of the endocrine system, secreting the hormones leptin and resistin.

The relationship between the subcutaneous adipose layer and total body fat in a person is often modelled by using regression equations. The most popular of these equations was formed by Durnin and Wormersley, who rigorously tested many types of skinfold, and, as a result, created two formulae to calculate the body density of both men and women. These equations present an inverse correlation between skinfolds and body density—as the sum of skinfolds increases, the body density decreases.

Factors such as sex, age, population size or other variables may make the equations invalid and unusable, and, as of 2012, Durnin and Wormersley's equations remain only estimates of a person's true level of fatness. New formulae are still being created.

=== Marrow fat ===
Marrow fat, also known as marrow adipose tissue (MAT), is a poorly understood adipose depot that resides in the bone and is interspersed with hematopoietic cells as well as bony elements. The adipocytes in this depot are derived from mesenchymal stem cells (MSC) which can give rise to fat cells, bone cells as well as other cell types. The fact that MAT increases in the setting of calorie restriction/ anorexia is a feature that distinguishes this depot from other fat depots. Exercise regulates MAT, decreasing MAT quantity and diminishing the size of marrow adipocytes. The exercise regulation of marrow fat suggests that it bears some physiologic similarity to other white adipose depots. Moreover, increased MAT in obesity further suggests a similarity to white fat depots.

=== Ectopic fat ===
Ectopic fat is the storage of triglycerides in tissues other than adipose tissue, that are supposed to contain only small amounts of fat, such as the liver, skeletal muscle, heart, and pancreas. This can interfere with cellular functions and hence organ function and is associated with insulin resistance in type 2 diabetes. It is stored in relatively high amounts around the organs of the abdominal cavity, but is not to be confused with visceral fat.

The specific cause for the accumulation of ectopic fat is unknown. The cause is likely a combination of genetic, environmental, and behavioral factors that are involved in excess energy intake and decreased physical activity. Substantial weight loss can reduce ectopic fat stores in all organs and this is associated with an improvement of the function of those organs.

In the latter case, non-invasive weight loss interventions like diet or exercise can decrease ectopic fat (particularly in heart and liver) in overweight or obese children and adults.

== Physiology ==
Free fatty acids (FFAs) are liberated from lipoproteins by lipoprotein lipase (LPL) and enter the adipocyte, where they are reassembled into triglycerides by esterifying them onto glycerol. Human fat tissue contains from 61% to 94% lipids. Lean and obese individuals tend towards the low and high ends of this range, respectively.

There is a constant flux of FFAs entering and leaving adipose tissue. The net direction of this flux is controlled by insulin and leptin—if insulin is elevated, then there is a net inward flux of FFA, and only when insulin is low can FFA leave adipose tissue. Insulin secretion is stimulated by high blood sugar, which results from consuming carbohydrates.

In humans, lipolysis (hydrolysis of triglycerides into free fatty acids) is controlled through the balanced control of lipolytic B-adrenergic receptors and a2A-adrenergic receptor-mediated antilipolysis.

Fat cells have an important physiological role in maintaining triglyceride and free fatty acid levels, as well as determining insulin resistance. Abdominal fat has a different metabolic profile—being more prone to induce insulin resistance. This explains to a large degree why central obesity is a marker of impaired glucose tolerance and is an independent risk factor for cardiovascular disease (even in the absence of diabetes mellitus and hypertension).

Recent advances in biotechnology have allowed for the harvesting of adult stem cells from adipose tissue, allowing stimulation of tissue regrowth using a patient's own cells. In addition, adipose-derived stem cells from both human and animals reportedly can be efficiently reprogrammed into induced pluripotent stem cells without the need for feeder cells. The use of a patient's own cells reduces the chance of tissue rejection and avoids ethical issues associated with the use of human embryonic stem cells. A growing body of evidence also suggests that different fat depots (i.e. abdominal, omental, pericardial) yield adipose-derived stem cells with different characteristics. These depot-dependent features include proliferation rate, immunophenotype, differentiation potential, gene expression, as well as sensitivity to hypoxic culture conditions. Oxygen levels seem to play an important role on the metabolism and in general the function of adipose-derived stem cells.

Adipose tissue is a major peripheral source of aromatase in both males and females, contributing to the production of estradiol.

Adipose derived hormones include:

- Adiponectin
- Resistin
- Plasminogen activator inhibitor-1 (PAI-1)
- TNFα
- IL-6
- Leptin
- Estradiol (E2)

Adipose tissues also secrete a type of cytokines (cell-to-cell signalling proteins) called adipokines (adipose cytokines), which play a role in obesity-associated complications. Perivascular adipose tissue releases adipokines such as adiponectin that affect the contractile function of the vessels that they surround.

=== Brown fat ===
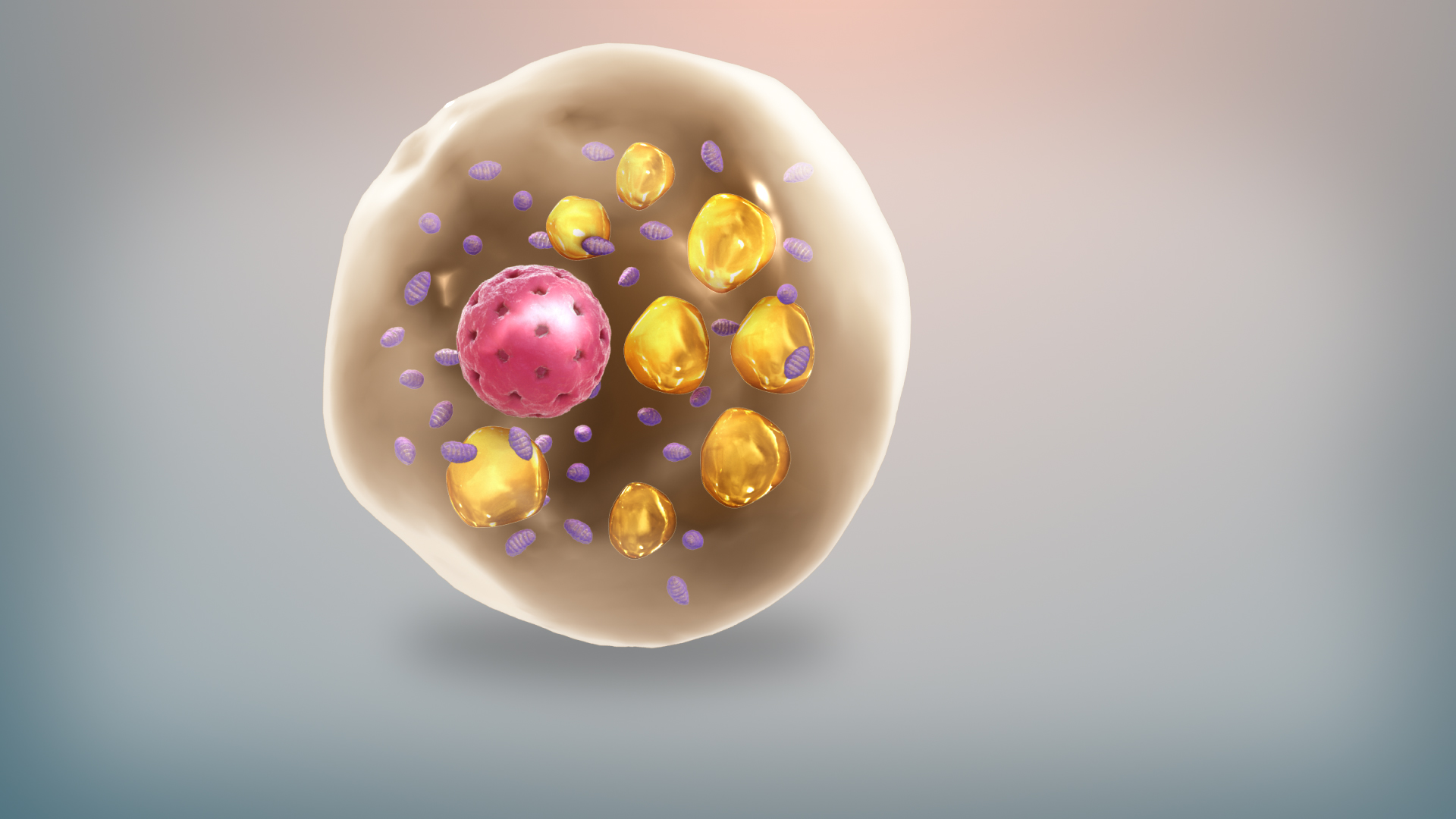
Brown fat cell

Brown fat or brown adipose tissue (BAT) is a specialized form of adipose tissue important for adaptive thermogenesis in humans and other mammals. BAT can generate heat by "uncoupling" the respiratory chain of oxidative phosphorylation within mitochondria through tissue-specific expression of uncoupling protein 1 (UCP1). BAT is primarily located around the neck and large blood vessels of the thorax, where it may effectively act in heat exchange. BAT is robustly activated upon cold exposure by the release of catecholamines from sympathetic nerves that results in UCP1 activation. Nearly half of the nerves present in adipose tissue are sensory neurons connected to the dorsal root ganglia.

BAT activation may also occur in response to overfeeding. UCP1 activity is stimulated by long chain fatty acids that are produced subsequent to β-adrenergic receptor activation. UCP1 is proposed to function as a fatty acid proton symporter, although the exact mechanism has yet to be elucidated. In contrast, UCP1 is inhibited by ATP, ADP, and GTP.

Attempts to simulate this process pharmacologically have so far been unsuccessful. Techniques to manipulate the differentiation of "brown fat" could become a mechanism for weight loss therapy in the future, encouraging the growth of tissue with this specialized metabolism without inducing it in other organs. A review on the eventual therapeutic targeting of brown fat to treat human obesity was published by Samuelson and Vidal-Puig in 2020.

Until recently, brown adipose tissue in humans was thought to be primarily limited to infants, but new evidence has overturned that belief. Metabolically active tissue with temperature responses similar to brown adipose was first reported in the neck and trunk of some human adults in 2007, and the presence of brown adipose in human adults was later verified histologically in the same anatomical regions.

=== Beige fat and WAT browning ===
Browning of WAT, also referred to as "beiging", occurs when adipocytes within WAT depots develop features of BAT. Beige adipocytes take on a multilocular appearance (containing several lipid droplets) and increase expression of uncoupling protein 1 (UCP1). In doing so, these normally energy-storing adipocytes become energy-releasing adipocytes.

The calorie-burning capacity of brown and beige fat has been extensively studied as research efforts focus on therapies targeted to treat obesity and diabetes. The drug 2,4-dinitrophenol, which also acts as a chemical uncoupler similarly to UCP1, was used for weight loss in the 1930s. However, it was quickly discontinued when excessive dosing led to adverse side effects including hyperthermia and death. β_{3}-adrenergic agonists, like CL316,243, have also been developed and tested in humans. However, the use of such drugs has proven largely unsuccessful due to several challenges, including varying species receptor specificity and poor oral bioavailability.

Cold is a primary regulator of BAT processes and induces WAT browning. Browning in response to chronic cold exposure has been well documented and is a reversible process. A study in mice demonstrated that cold-induced browning can be completely reversed in 21 days, with measurable decreases in UCP1 seen within a 24-hour period. A study by Rosenwald et al. revealed that when the animals are re-exposed to a cold environment, the same adipocytes will adopt a beige phenotype, suggesting that beige adipocytes are retained.

Transcriptional regulators, as well as a growing number of other factors, regulate the induction of beige fat. Four regulators of transcription are central to WAT browning and serve as targets for many of the molecules known to influence this process. These include peroxisome proliferator-activated receptor gamma (PPARγ), PRDM16, peroxisome proliferator-activated receptor gamma coactivator 1 alpha (PGC-1α), and Early B-Cell Factor-2 (EBF2).

The list of molecules that influence browning has grown in direct proportion to the popularity of this topic and is constantly evolving as more knowledge is acquired. Among these molecules are irisin and fibroblast growth factor 21 (FGF21), which have been well-studied and are believed to be important regulators of browning. Irisin is secreted from muscle in response to exercise and has been shown to increase browning by acting on beige preadipocytes. FGF21, a hormone secreted mainly by the liver, has garnered a great deal of interest after being identified as a potent stimulator of glucose uptake and a browning regulator through its effects on PGC-1α. It is increased in BAT during cold exposure and is thought to aid in resistance to diet-induced obesity FGF21 may also be secreted in response to exercise and a low protein diet, although the latter has not been thoroughly investigated. Data from these studies suggest that environmental factors like diet and exercise may be important mediators of browning. In mice, it was found that beiging can occur through the production of methionine-enkephalin peptides by type 2 innate lymphoid cells in response to interleukin 33.

=== Genomics and bioinformatics tools to study browning ===
Due to the complex nature of adipose tissue and a growing list of browning regulatory molecules, great potential exists for the use of bioinformatics tools to improve study within this field. Studies of WAT browning have greatly benefited from advances in these techniques, as beige fat is rapidly gaining popularity as a therapeutic target for the treatment of obesity and diabetes.

DNA microarray is a bioinformatics tool used to quantify expression levels of various genes simultaneously, and has been used extensively in the study of adipose tissue. One such study used microarray analysis in conjunction with Ingenuity IPA software to look at changes in WAT and BAT gene expression when mice were exposed to temperatures of 28 and 6 °C. The most significantly up- and downregulated genes were then identified and used for analysis of differentially expressed pathways. It was discovered that many of the pathways upregulated in WAT after cold exposure are also highly expressed in BAT, such as oxidative phosphorylation, fatty acid metabolism, and pyruvate metabolism. This suggests that some of the adipocytes switched to a beige phenotype at 6 °C. Mössenböck et al. also used microarray analysis to demonstrate that insulin deficiency inhibits the differentiation of beige adipocytes but does not disturb their capacity for browning. These two studies demonstrate the potential for the use of microarray in the study of WAT browning.

RNA sequencing (RNA-Seq) is a powerful computational tool that allows for the quantification of RNA expression for all genes within a sample. Incorporating RNA-Seq into browning studies is of great value, as it offers better specificity, sensitivity, and a more comprehensive overview of gene expression than other methods. RNA-Seq has been used in both human and mouse studies in an attempt characterize beige adipocytes according to their gene expression profiles and to identify potential therapeutic molecules that may induce the beige phenotype. One such study used RNA-Seq to compare gene expression profiles of WAT from wild-type (WT) mice and those overexpressing Early B-Cell Factor-2 (EBF2). WAT from the transgenic animals exhibited a brown fat gene program and had decreased WAT specific gene expression compared to the WT mice. Thus, EBF2 has been identified as a potential therapeutic molecule to induce beiging.

Chromatin immunoprecipitation with sequencing (ChIP-seq) is a method used to identify protein binding sites on DNA and assess histone modifications. This tool has enabled examination of epigenetic regulation of browning and helps elucidate the mechanisms by which protein-DNA interactions stimulate the differentiation of beige adipocytes. Studies observing the chromatin landscapes of beige adipocytes have found that adipogenesis of these cells results from the formation of cell specific chromatin landscapes, which regulate the transcriptional program and, ultimately, control differentiation. Using ChIP-seq in conjunction with other tools, recent studies have identified over 30 transcriptional and epigenetic factors that influence beige adipocyte development.

=== Genetics ===
The thrifty gene hypothesis (also called the famine hypothesis) states that in some populations the body would be more efficient at retaining fat in times of plenty, thereby endowing greater resistance to starvation in times of food scarcity. This hypothesis, originally advanced in the context of glucose metabolism and insulin resistance, has been discredited by physical anthropologists, physiologists, and the original proponent of the idea himself with respect to that context, although according to its developer it remains "as viable as when [it was] first advanced" in other contexts.

In 1995, Jeffrey Friedman, in his residency at the Rockefeller University, together with Rudolph Leibel, Douglas Coleman et al. discovered the protein leptin that the genetically obese mouse lacked. Leptin is produced in the white adipose tissue and signals to the hypothalamus. When leptin levels drop, the body interprets this as a loss of energy, and hunger increases. Mice lacking this protein eat until they are four times their normal size.

Leptin, however, plays a different role in diet-induced obesity in rodents and humans. Because adipocytes produce leptin, leptin levels are elevated in the obese. However, hunger remains, and—when leptin levels drop due to weight loss—hunger increases. The drop of leptin is better viewed as a starvation signal than the rise of leptin as a satiety signal. However, elevated leptin in obesity is known as leptin resistance. The changes that occur in the hypothalamus to result in leptin resistance in obesity are currently the focus of obesity research.

Gene defects in the leptin gene (ob) are rare in human obesity. As of July 2010, only 14 individuals from five families have been identified worldwide who carry a mutated ob gene (one of which was the first ever identified cause of genetic obesity in humans)—two families of Pakistani origin living in the UK, one family living in Turkey, one in Egypt, and one in Austria—and two other families have been found that carry a mutated ob receptor. Others have been identified as genetically partially deficient in leptin, and, in these individuals, leptin levels on the low end of the normal range can predict obesity.

Several mutations of genes involving the melanocortins (used in brain signaling associated with appetite) and their receptors have also been identified as causing obesity in a larger portion of the population than leptin mutations.

=== Epigenetics ===
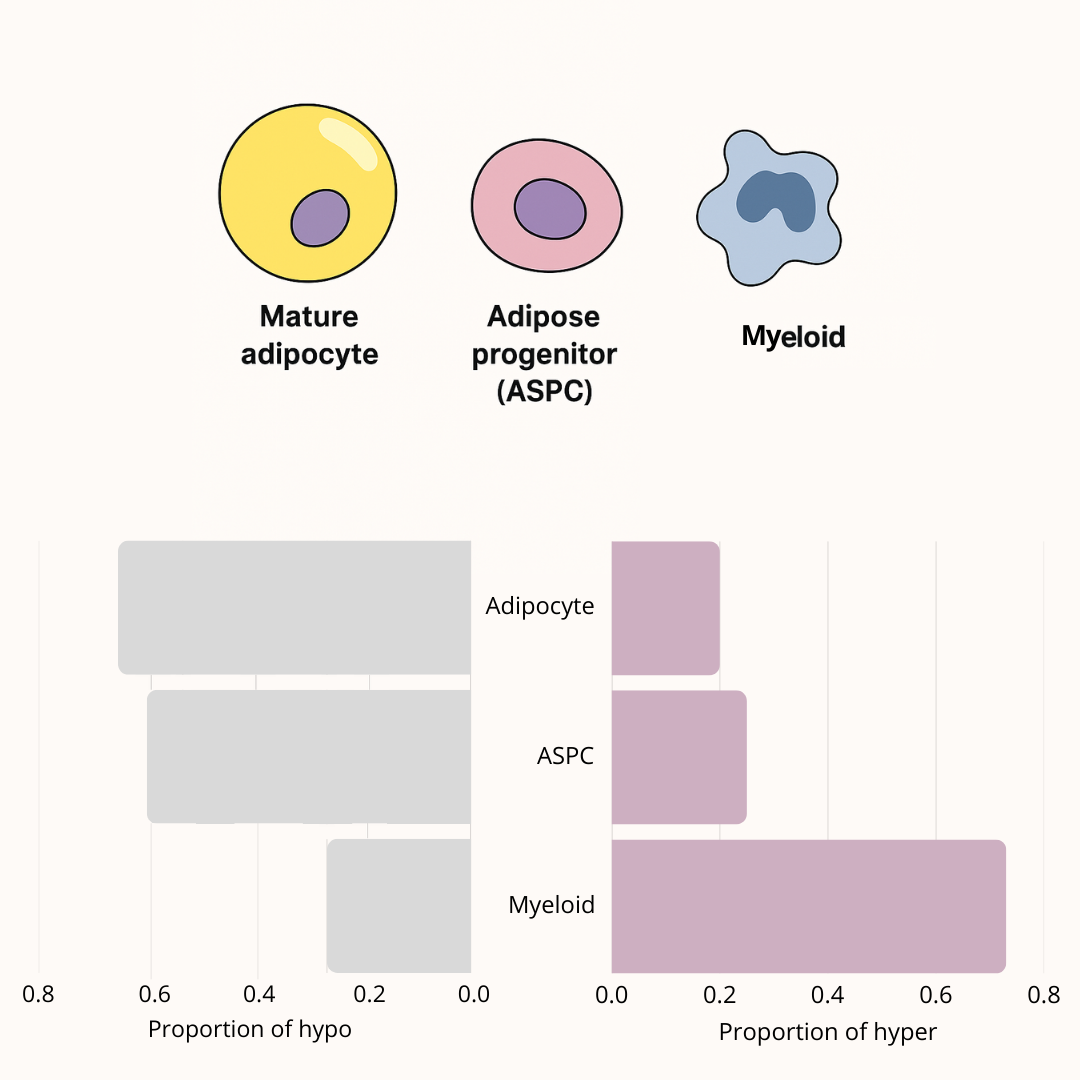
Epigenetic patterns of DNA methylation, highlighting high hypomethylation in adipocytes and ASPCs and predominant hypermethylation in myeloid cells.

Different cell types within adipose tissue exhibit distinct DNA methylation patterns. Mature adipocytes and adipose progenitor cells (ASPCs) show a high degree of hypomethylation, affecting more than 50% of their regulatory regions. This hypomethylation is associated with the activation of genes involved in triglyceride synthesis, such as glycerol‑3‑phosphate acyltransferase 1 (GPAM).

In contrast, myeloid cells display approximately 73% hypermethylated regions, reflecting an epigenetic program opposite to that of the adipocytic lineage.

Overall, there is a direct relationship between DNA demethylation and gene expression, whereby highly expressed genes tend to exhibit low methylation levels. These epigenetic patterns contribute to defining the functional identity of the different cell types within subcutaneous adipose tissue (SAT).

=== Physical properties ===
Adipose tissue has a density of ~0.9 g/ml. Thus, a person with more adipose tissue will float more easily than a person of the same weight with more muscular tissue, since muscular tissue has a density of 1.06 g/ml.

=== Genomic Architecture and Risk of Abdominal Obesity ===
In addition to the visible changes in adipose tissue associated with obesity, recent research indicates that the risk of developing abdominal obesity and cardiometabolic alterations also depends on the 3D organization of the genome in subcutaneous adipose tissue. Single‑cell epigenomic studies have shown that many genetic variants associated with abdominal fat distribution (measured as WHRadjBMI) are preferentially located in active genomic regions of adipocytes. These regions display low levels of DNA methylation and belong to the so‑called A compartment, which is characterized by higher gene activity. These findings suggest that adipocytes in subcutaneous adipose tissue play a key role in mediating the genetic risk associated with abdominal obesity.

== Body fat meter ==
A body fat meter is a tool used to measure the body fat to weight ratio in the human body. Different meters use various methods to determine the ratio. They tend to under-read body fat percentage.

In contrast with clinical tools like DXA and underwater weighing, one relatively inexpensive type of body fat meter uses the principle of bioelectrical impedance analysis (BIA) in order to determine an individual's body fat percentage. To achieve this, the meter passes a small, harmless, electric current through the body and measures the resistance, then uses information on the person's weight, height, age, and sex to calculate an approximate value for the person's body fat percentage. The calculation measures the total volume of water in the body (lean tissue and muscle contain a higher percentage of water than fat), and estimates the percentage of fat based on this information. The result can fluctuate several percentage points depending on what has been eaten and how much water has been drunk before the analysis. This method is quick and readily accessible, but imprecise. Alternative methods are: skin fold methods using calipers, underwater weighing, whole body air displacement plethysmography (ADP) and DXA.

== Gallery ==
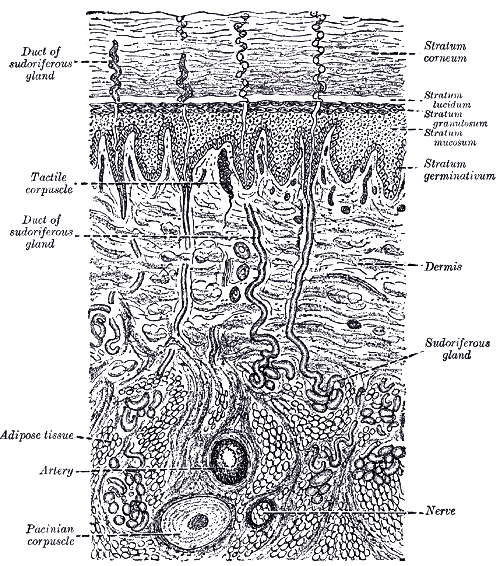
Diagrammatic sectional view of the skin (magnified)

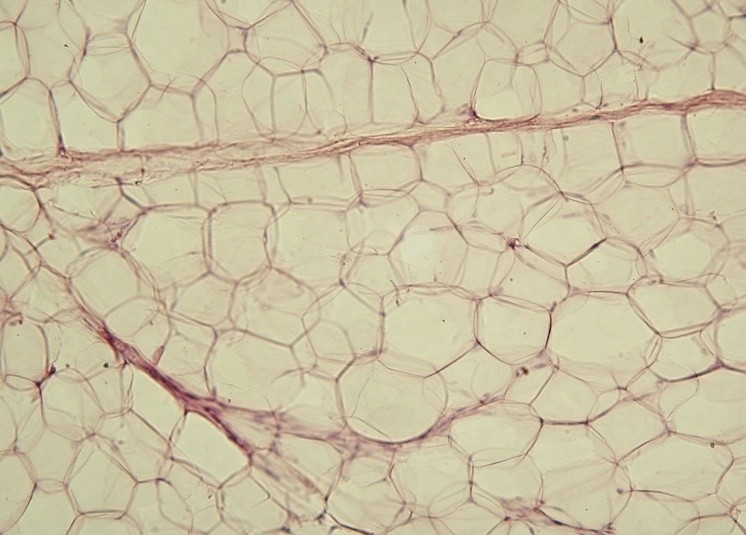
White adipose tissue in paraffin section

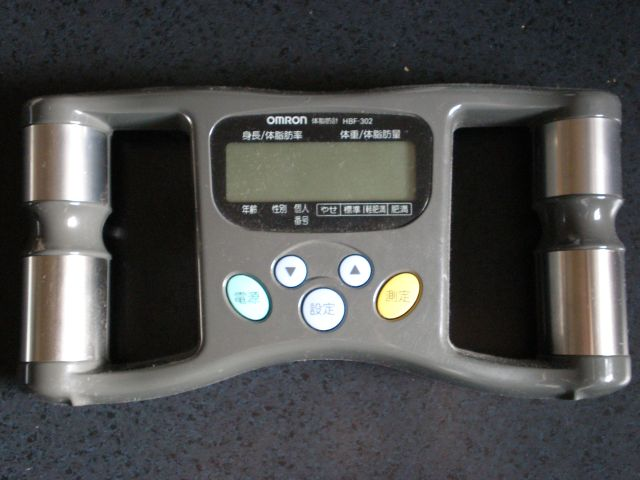
Electronic instrument of body fat meter

== See also ==
- Adipose differentiation-related protein
- Adipocytes
- Apelin
- Bioelectrical impedance analysis – a method to measure body fat percentage.
- Blubber – an extra thick form of adipose tissue found in some marine mammals.
- Body fat percentage
- Body roundness index
- Cellulite
- Lipolysis
- Lipodystrophy
- Human fat used as pharmaceutical in traditional medicine
- Obesity
- Starvation
- Steatosis (also called fatty change, fatty degeneration or adipose degeneration)
- Stem cells
- Subcutaneous fat
- Bariatrics
- Classification of obesity
- Classification of childhood obesity
- EPODE International Network, the world's largest obesity-prevention network
- World Fit A program of the United States Olympic Committee (USOC), and the United States Olympians and Paralympians Association (USOP)
- Obesity and walking
- Social stigma of obesity
