= Obesity and walking =

Obesity and walking describes how the locomotion of walking differs between an obese individual (BMI ≥ 30 kg/m^{2}) and a non-obese individual. Knee osteoarthritis and other joint pain are common complaints amongst obese individuals and are often a reason as to why exercise prescriptions such as walking are not continued after prescribed. To determine why an obese person might have more joint problems than a non-obese individual, the biomechanical parameters must be observed to see differences between obese and non-obese walking.

== Biomechanics ==
=== Stride and cadence ===
Numerous studies have examined the differences in stride between obese and non-obese individuals. Spyropoulos et al. in 1991 examined stride length, width, and joint angle differences between the two groups. They found that obese individuals take shorter (1.25 m vs. 1.67 m) and wider (0.16 m vs. 0.08 m) strides than their non-obese counterparts. Browning and Kram also observed obese people taking wider strides (~30% greater) across differing walking speeds (0.50, 0.75, 1.00, 1.50, and 1.75 m/s), but the stride width did not change with differing speed. They did not find stride lengths to be different across speeds. Along with taking wider strides, several articles have found obese individuals to walk at slower velocities than their non-obese counterparts, claiming that this might be due to balance and body control while walking. Ledin and Odkvist support this theory in a study when they added mass by way of a weighted shirt (20% body weight) to lean individuals and saw sway increase. Increased sway has also been observed in pre-pubertal boys. Though obese individuals may be able to accommodate for the extra mass in terms of balance because they walk with it every day, several studies have found that obese people spend more time in the stance rather than swing phase during the walking cycle and increase double support time. Slower cadences, or number of steps within a certain period of time, have also been associated with obese individuals when compared to lean individuals and would be expected with slower walking speeds. Others have found no difference in obese people walking velocities and find that they share a similar preferred walking speed with lean individuals.

=== Joint angle differences ===
In a study by DeVita and Hortobágyi, obese people were found to be more erect throughout the stance phase with greater hip extension, less knee flexion, and more plantarflexion during the course of stance than non-obese people. They also found that obese individuals had less knee flexion in early stance and greater plantarflexion at toe off. In a study looking at knee extension, Messier et al. found a significant positive correlation with maximum knee extension and BMI. That same study looked at mean angular velocities at the hip and ankle and found no difference between obese and lean individuals.

=== Ground reaction force ===
A ground reaction force is the force that is exerted by the ground onto whatever body is in contact with the ground and is equal to the force that is placed on the ground. An example is the force that the ground exerts onto the foot and then up the leg of a person when walking and making contact with the ground. These can be measured by having a subject walk across a force platform and collect the forces exerted on the ground. These forces have long been thought to increase loads on the knee and would increase with greater mass from an obese person. This may be a predictor of osteoarthritis for an obese subject as the vertical force has been documented to potentially be the most significant force that is transmitted up the leg to the knee. In 1996, Messier and colleagues observed the differences in ground reaction forces between obese and lean older adults with osteoarthritis. They found that when they accounted for age and walking velocity, the vertical force was significantly positively correlated with BMI. Therefore, as BMI increased, the forces increased. They found this in not only the vertical force, but also in the anteroposterior and mediolateral forces. Because of the study population, this study did not compare obese adults with lean counterparts. Browning and Kram in 2006 observed two groups (one obese and one non-obese group) of young adult's ground reaction forces across different speeds. They found that absolute ground reaction forces were significantly greater for the obese people than the non-obese group at slower walking speeds and at each walking speed the peak vertical force was approximately 60% greater. Absolute peak in the anteroposterior and mediolateral directions were also greater for the obese group but the difference was erased when scaled to body weight. Forces were also greatly reduced at slower walking speeds.

=== Net muscle moments ===
Lower extremity joint loading is estimated through net muscle moments, joint reaction forces, and joint loading rates. Net muscle moments can increase up to 40% as walking speeds rise from 1.2 to 1.5 m/s. One could then predict that as speed increases, loads felt by the lower-extremity joints would increase as the net muscle moments and ground reaction forces increase. Browning and Kram have also found that stance-phase sagittal-plane net muscle moments are greater in obese adults when compared to lean individuals.

== Energetics ==
=== Metabolic rate ===
It is well established that obese individuals expend a greater amount of metabolic energy at rest and when performing some physical activity such as walking than lean individuals,. Added mass demands more energy to move. This is observed in a study by Foster et al. in 1995 when they took 11 obese women and calculated their energy expenditure before and after weight loss. They found that after significant weight loss, the subjects expended less energy on the same task as they did when they were heavier. To determine if walking was more expensive per kilogram of body mass and if obese individuals preferred walking speeds would be slower, Browning and Kram sought to characterize the metabolic energy obese females would expend while walking across differing speeds. They found that walking for obese women was 11% more expensive per kilogram of body mass than lean individuals and that the obese women preferred to walk at a similar speed as the lean individuals that minimized their gross energy cost per distance. Wanting to look at metabolic rates of obese men compared to obese women and determine if the adipose distribution (gynoid vs. android) differing between the sexes play a role in energy expenditure, Browning et al. observed class II obese males and females walking across differing speeds. They found that standing metabolic rate when normalized for body weight was ~20% less for obese people (more adipose tissue and less metabolically active tissue), but that metabolic rates during walking were ~10% greater per kilogram body mass for obese individuals when compared to lean. These researchers also found that increased thigh mass and adipose distribution did not matter, overall body composition of percent body fat was related to net metabolic rate. Therefore, obese individuals are using more metabolic energy than their lean counterparts when walking at the same speed.

=== Normalization ===
Many measurements are normalized to body weight in order to account for differing body weights when doing comparisons (see VO_{2} max testing). Normalizing body weight when comparing obese and lean individuals' metabolic rates reduces the difference, indicating that body weight rather than body fat composition is the primary indicator for the metabolic cost of walking. Caution must be taken when analyzing the scientific literature to understand if findings are normalized or not because they may be interpreted differently.

== Possible strategies ==
One possible suggested strategy to maximize energy expenditure while reducing lower joint extremity is to have obese people walk at a slow speed with an incline. Researchers found that by walking at either 0.5 or 0.75 m/s and a 9° or 6° incline respectively would equate to the same net metabolic rate as an obese individual walking at 1.50 m/s with no incline. These slower speeds with an incline also had significantly reduced loading rates and reduced lower-extremity net muscle moments. Other strategies to consider are slow walking for extended periods of time and training underwater to reduce loads on joints and increase lean body mass.

== See also ==
- Bioelectrical impedance analysis – a method to measure body fat percentage.
- Body fat percentage
- Hot Girl Walk - This program brings women together through inclusive fitness training, promoting holistic well-being.
- Co-benefits of climate change mitigation
- Effects of the car on societies
- Exercise trends
- Human fat used as pharmaceutical in traditional medicine
- Obesity and the environment
- Preferred walking speed
- Social influences on fitness behavior
- Steatosis (also called fatty change, fatty degeneration or adipose degeneration)
- Stem cells
- Subcutaneous fat
- Bariatrics
- Classification of obesity
- Classification of childhood obesity
- EPODE International Network
  - World Fit
- Social stigma of obesity
- Walkability
- Walking audit
- Walking city
