= FLVS =

FLVS may refer to:

- Florida Virtual School (FLVS, flvs.net; est. 1997), an online school in Florida, USA
- Fleurbaix-Laventie Ville Santé, the predecessor to EPODE International Network (Ensemble Prévenons l'ObésitéDes Enfants)
- forward-looking vision system, see Boom XB-1

== See also ==
- FLV (disambiguation), for the singular of FLVs
