= Adipose-derived hormones =

Hormones secreted by adipose tissue

Adipose tissue is an endocrine organ that secretes numerous protein hormones, including leptin, adiponectin, and resistin. These hormones generally influence energy metabolism, which is of great interest to the understanding and treatment of type 2 diabetes and obesity.

Their relative roles in modifying appetite, insulin resistance and atherosclerosis are the subjects of intense research, as they may be modifiable causes of morbidity in people with obesity.

== History of adipose-derived hormones ==
It had been shown that adipose tissue secreted some unknown factor that influenced appetite. However, the importance of adipose tissue as an endocrine organ was only fully appreciated in 1995 with the discovery of leptin, the protein product of the Ob gene. Leptin is a strong appetite suppressant that, when depleted, causes early onset severe obesity in humans and in animal models. Low levels of leptin in the blood plasma have been heavily associated with people who have moderate to severe forms of depression. Leptin is known to influence moods and cognition by inducing some structural and functional changes within the hippocampus and prefrontal cortex. Also, leptin has been shown to activate signal transduction pathways associated with dopamine and mTOR, which can increase synaptogenesis. Leptin's role in neuroplasticity is currently still being elucidated, but it has been proven to be active in regions of the brain closely linked to depression. It was found that leptin has antidepressant-like effects similar to that of selective serotonin reuptake inhibitors (SSRIs).

The discovery of leptin and its effects on appetite led to hopes of a treatment for obesity and type 2 diabetes, a major disease in the developed world. Unfortunately, clinical studies using leptin as a treatment for obesity in humans failed to show improvement, leading some scientists to conclude that the brain can become resistant to leptin, even at supra-physiological levels (the so-called "ceiling effect"), rendering treatment with leptin ineffective. However, although the notion of obesity as a state of 'leptin resistance' has become ingrained in the minds of many researchers, data does not directly support this contention. For example, the work of Rudolph Leibel at Columbia University shows that, in both obese and lean individuals, leptin injections do not reduce body mass. The finding that both lean and obese subjects have a similar lack of response underscores the notion that the brain is not designed to respond to increased leptin by decreasing food intake; rather, lack of leptin acts as a signal to increase food intake. Indeed, Leibel's work has shown that the decreases in serum leptin that occur post-weight-loss constitute a state of leptin deficiency, which drives increased appetite with weight loss. As such, leptin injections in weight-reduced patients can prevent increases in appetite and thereby allow patients to maintain weight loss. These studies, therefore, demonstrate that leptin treatment may be a useful strategy to treat obesity in humans, if not by driving weight loss directly then by allowing weight loss (as a result of diet and exercise) to be more readily maintained.

Moreover, as geneticists learn more from the few cases of leptin gene mutations, the possibility remains that, although leptin was ineffective at treating obesity across the population, some individual obese patients might still benefit from its use as an anti-obesity medication.

Research into the adipose-derived hormones adiponectin and resistin is ongoing. Like leptin, these hormones also affect energy balance and metabolism. Like leptin, observations in both humans and animal models have shown that adiponectin is relevant to insulin sensitivity and energy homeostasis. In contrast, the relationship between resistin and adiposity is not consistent between rodent models and human subjects (See Peter Arner, 2005: "Resistin: yet another adipokine tells us that men are not mice"); hence, the notion of resistin as a genuine adipose-derived hormone remains questionable.
