= Resistin =

Mammalian protein, acts as a multifunctional hormone

RETN
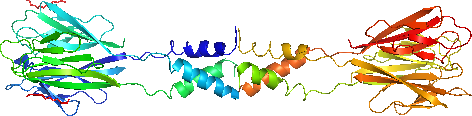

Identifiers
- Aliases: RETN, ADSF, FIZZ3, RETN1, RSTN, XCP1, resistin
- External IDs: OMIM: 605565; MGI: 1888506; GeneCards: RETN
Available structures
PDB	Ortholog search: PDBe RCSB
PDB	List of PDB id codes 1LV6

Gene location (Human)
Chr.	Chromosome 19 (human)
Band	19p13.2	Start	7,669,049 bp
Band	19p13.2	End	7,670,455 bp

Gene location (Mouse)
Chr.	Chromosome 8 (mouse)
Band	8 A1.1|8 1.92 cM	Start	3,705,770 bp
Band	8 A1.1|8 1.92 cM	End	3,710,110 bp
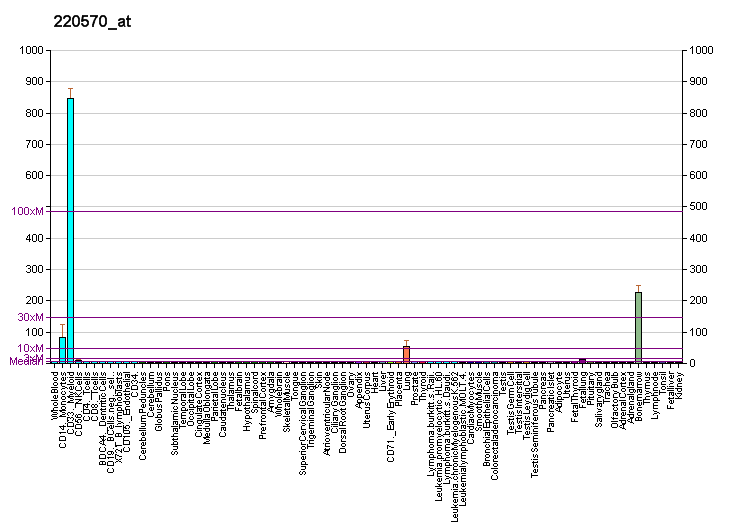
RNA expression pattern
Bgee	Human / Mouse (ortholog); Top expressed in: bone marrow; bone marrow cell; monocyte; trabecular bone; granulocyte; right lung; upper lobe of left lung; blood; spleen; gastric mucosa / Top expressed in: white adipose tissue; subcutaneous adipose tissue; tunica adventitia of aorta; lactiferous gland; intercostal muscle; tunica media of zone of aorta; mesenteric lymph nodes; brown adipose tissue; ankle joint; skin of abdomen; More reference expression data
BioGPS	More reference expression data
Gene ontology
Molecular function	hormone activity
Cellular component	extracellular exosome; nucleus; extracellular region; extracellular space; azurophil granule lumen; specific granule lumen
Biological process	positive regulation of smooth muscle cell migration; response to insulin; positive regulation of progesterone secretion; response to mechanical stimulus; ageing; positive regulation of collagen metabolic process; fat cell differentiation; positive regulation of synaptic transmission; negative regulation of feeding behavior; positive regulation of smooth muscle cell proliferation; neutrophil degranulation; regulation of signaling receptor activity; biological process; signal transduction
Sources:Amigo / QuickGO
Orthologs
Databases	NCBI: entry; OMA: entry
Species	Human	Mouse
Entrez	56729	57264
Ensembl	ENSG00000104918	ENSMUSG00000012705
UniProt	Q9HD89	Q99P87
RefSeq (mRNA)	NM_020415; NM_001193374; NM_001385725; NM_001385726; NM_001385727	NM_001204959; NM_022984
RefSeq (protein)	NP_001180303; NP_065148	NP_001191888; NP_075360
Location (UCSC)	Chr 19: 7.67 – 7.67 Mb	Chr 8: 3.71 – 3.71 Mb
PubMed search
- Wikidata
View/Edit Human	View/Edit Mouse

Resistin, also known as adipose tissue-specific secretory factor (ADSF) or C/EBP-epsilon-regulated myeloid-specific secreted cysteine-rich protein (XCP1), is a cysteine-rich peptide hormone that is derived from adipose tissue and, in humans, is encoded by the RETN gene.

In primates, pigs, and dogs, resistin is secreted primarily by immune and epithelial cells, whereas in rodents, it is mainly secreted by adipose tissue. The human resistin pre-peptide consists of 108 amino acid residues, while in mice and rats it is 114 amino acids in length; the molecular weight is approximately 12.5 kDa. Resistin is classified as an adipose-derived hormone (similar to a cytokine), and its physiological role has been widely debated, particularly regarding its involvement in obesity and type II diabetes mellitus (T2DM).

== Discovery and structure ==
Resistin was discovered in 2001 and identified as a hormone produced by adipose tissue, with a role in promoting insulin resistance. Specifically, elevated resistin levels appear to interfere with the action of insulin on adipose cells. Subsequent studies noted a link between resistin and activation of pro-inflammatory cytokines.

Resistin

Identifiers
- Symbol: Resistin
- Pfam: PF06954
- InterPro: IPR009714
- SCOP2: 1rgx / SCOPe / SUPFAM
- OPM superfamily: 384
- OPM protein: 1rgx
Available protein structures:
- PDB: IPR009714 PF06954 (ECOD; PDBsum)
- AlphaFold: IPR009714; PF06954

Resistin is a cysteine-rich, secreted peptide hormone characterized by a unique multimeric structure. Each resistin monomer consists of a C-terminal, disulfide-rich beta-sandwich "head" domain and an N-terminal alpha-helical "tail" segment. The head domain adopts a six-stranded jelly-roll topology, forming two three-stranded antiparallel beta-sheets, while the tail segments associate to create three-stranded coiled coils. These monomers assemble into trimers, and further interchain disulfide linkages mediate the formation of tail-to-tail hexamers, resulting in a multimeric assembly stabilized by disulfide bonds. In circulation, resistin exists in multiple assembly states, including high-molecular-mass hexamers and lower-molecular-mass trimers, with the oligomeric form in humans showing greater proinflammatory activity. This structural organization is highly conserved within the resistin-like molecule family of peptide hormones.

== Function ==
Resistin is a multifunctional hormone that plays critical roles in metabolic regulation, inflammation, and innate immunity. In humans, resistin is primarily expressed by immune cells such as monocytes and macrophages, where it acts as a pro-inflammatory cytokine by stimulating the production of cytokines including IL-6, IL-1β, and TNF-α through activation of signaling pathways involving the TLR4 and CAP1 receptors.

Beyond its pro-inflammatory effects, resistin also demonstrates direct antimicrobial activity by damaging bacterial membranes, and it modulates immune responses by recruiting and activating immune cells, promoting chemokine production, and enhancing the formation of neutrophil extracellular traps (NETs). Notably, resistin exhibits bidirectional immunomodulatory properties: while it can amplify inflammation in response to certain stimuli, it can also attenuate excessive inflammatory responses triggered by bacterial products such as lipopolysaccharide (LPS), potentially by competing for TLR4 binding or directly neutralizing LPS. This dual functionality positions resistin as an important regulator of host defense and inflammatory balance in both health and disease.

== Clinical significance ==
=== Obesity and insulin resistance ===
Much of what is hypothesized about a resistin role in energy metabolism and T2DM can be derived from studies showing strong correlations between resistin and obesity, the premise being that serum resistin levels increase with increased adiposity. Conversely, serum resistin levels decline with decreased adiposity following medical treatment. Specifically, central obesity (waistline adipose tissue) is the region of adipose tissue that contributes most to rising levels of serum resistin. This is significant, considering the link between central obesity and insulin resistance, two marked peculiarities of T2DM. On the other hand, at least one study has found no correlation between resistin levels and obesity or insulin resistance in humans, so the resistin–insulin resistance connection may be regarded as somewhat unsettled.

Although resistin levels increase with obesity, it is questioned whether this increase is responsible for the insulin resistance associated with increased adiposity. Several reports have shown a positive correlation between resistin levels and insulin resistance. This is supported by reports of correlation between resistin levels and subjects with T2DM. If resistin contributes to the pathogenesis of insulin resistance in T2DM, then designing drugs to promote decreased serum resistin in T2DM subjects may deliver therapeutic benefits.

Resistin can increase levels of circulating low-density lipoprotein (LDL) and accelerates LDL accumulation in arteries, increasing risk of heart disease has an adverse impact on the efficacy of statins, the primary drug used to reduce cholesterol in fighting of cardiovascular disease. In the liver, resistin increases LDL production and degrades LDL receptors, impairing the ability to process LDL.

=== Inflammation ===
Beyond its role as a hormone, resistin also contributes to inflammation. Interleukin-12 (IL-12) and tumor necrosis factor-α (TNF-α) are up-regulated by resistin in an NF-κB-mediated fashion. Likewise, in vitro studies show Toll-like receptor 2 expression is increased by resistin. It has also been demonstrated that resistin upregulates vascular cell-adhesion molecule-1 (VCAM1), involved in chemotactic movement of leukocytes to sites of infection. Resistin itself can be upregulated by interleukins and also by microbial antigens such as lipopolysaccharide, which are recognized by leukocytes. Together, these findings suggest resistin may be a link in the well-known association between inflammation and insulin resistance.

Resistin also seems to be a marker of inflammation in semen. Higher resistin levels correlate with other proinflammatory mediators such as interleukin-6 (IL-6), elastase and tumor necrosis factor-α (TNF-α) in seminal plasma. During inflammation, the concentrations of cytokines and ROS increase, which may reduce male reproductive function. One study showed that hihger concentrations of seminal resistin caused lower sperm motility and vitality.

=== Hormonal disorders ===
A meta-analysis found levels of increased circulating resistin in women with polyendocrine metabolic ovarian syndrome (PMOS, formerly polycystic ovary syndrome). This effect was independent of obesity, showing that adipokines like resistin may contribute to the pathology of PMOS.
