= EPODE International Network =

International nonprofit organization

- Founded: April 7, 2011
- Founder: Armando Barriguete
- Type: Non-governmental organization
- Purpose: Humanitarian
- Location: Brussels, Belgium
- Origins: FLVS study 1992
- Region served: Worldwide
- Product: Childhood obesity prevention programs
- Method: Education, Public Policy, Best practice sharing & capacity building
- Members: 35 program members
- Key people: Jean-Michel Borys, Brigitte Bout, Dennis Edell, Emile Levy, Jan Vinck, Pauline Harper
- Revenue: Nonprofit organization
- Employees: 4
- Website: www.epode-international-network.com

EPODE International Network (EIN) is a not-for-profit, non-governmental organisation that seeks to support childhood obesity-prevention programmes across the world.

The name EPODE comes from the French phrase Ensemble Prévenons l'Obésité Des Enfants; in English Together Let's Prevent Childhood Obesity

In light of the encouraging experiences and results of the EPODE methodology (towns in Belgium that implemented the program saw a 22 percent decrease in overweight children), the EPODE International Network was created in 2011 as a response to the global demand for action concerning the increasing international prevalence of overweight and obesity and the related non-communicable diseases. The EPODE International Network works to promote the prevention of childhood obesity by supporting Community Based Programmes (CBPs).

== Organization ==
The EPODE International Network is an NGO, a network of community-based and school-based childhood obesity-prevention programmes as well as healthy active initiatives aimed at preventing childhood adiposity & overweight in children.

The network is coordinated by a dedicated unit and is supported by 3 platforms, gathering a broad diversity of actors:

- A Scientific Board and Platform, with 18 internationally recognized experts in the fields of nutrition and physical activity to provide scientific guidance for the implementation and evaluation processes to prevent childhood obesity.
- A Ministers’ Club, gathering Ministers, State Secretaries, members of Parliament and Mayors to raise awareness on the childhood obesity issue and to advocate for strong and sustainable political involvement in the development of CBPs, SBPs & HAIs around the world.
- A Public-Private Partnership Platform, linking representatives of the civil society, corporate sector, NGOs and institutions to stimulate multistakeholder, concerted and coordinated partnerships supporting the implementation of CBPs around the world.

In addition, the EPODE International Network holds regional and global forums which represent a call for global perspectives, solutions and commitments to solve the obesity and NCD crises worldwide.

=== Activities ===
In order to support its member childhood obesity-prevention programmes, the EIN organises regional and global meetings in order to facilitate best practice sharing and hold capacity-building workshops specific to the needs of its members. The EIN Scientific Advisory Board is also active in providing key support to members of the network in numerous ways, and notably providing valuable evaluation support and assisting programme members with the publication of their results.

Some activities include attempts to curb fast-food outlets near schools.

In France, Fleurbaix-Laventie Ville Santé (FLVS), a food and nutrition project, was taken up by 10 mid-sized French towns as part of a wider pilot scheme, EPODE, aimed at preventing obesity among five- to 12-year-olds.

=== Network members ===
The following countries around the world are members of the EPODE International Network:

- Belgium – Viasano
- Bulgaria – Healthy Kids
- France – Epode
- Greece – Paideiatrofi
- Israel – Healthy Living
- Italy - Eurobis

An EPODE Umbria Region Obesity Intervention Study reveals the Umbria region has now reached the alarming prevalence of 36% obesity in children

- Netherlands – Jogg
- Poland – Keep Fit
- Portugal – Munsi
- Romania – Sets
- Romania – Healthy Traditions
- Slovakia – Sporttube
- Spain – Thao
- United Kingdom – Phunkyfoods
- United Kingdom – Beat The Street
- Brazil – Agita Sao Paulo
- Canada – Real Food For Real Kid
- Chile – Elige Vivir Sano
- Mexico - Muevete Y Metete En Cintura
- Mexico - Colima - 5 Pasos Por Tu Salud Para Vivir Mejor
- Mexico - Hidalgo - Ya Bájale
- Mexico - Sonora- 5 Pasos - Sonora
- Mexico - Aguascalientes 2 - 5 Pasos Por Un Aguascalientes Saludable
- Mexico - Puebla - 5 Pasos Por Tu Salud En Familia
- Mexico - Durango - Atrevete Vive Saludable En 5 Pasos
- Mexico - Aguascalientes - 5 Pasos Por Tu Salud
- Mexico - Montemorelos - Montemorelos Adelante Con 5 Pasos
- Mexico - Edomex 5 Pasos - Control De Peso En Capulhuac
- United States- World Fit
- Australia – Opal
- Australia – Pcm
- New Zealand – Energize
- Taiwan – Health Promotion
- Singapore – Health Promotion

=== EPODE Ministers' Club ===
The EIN Ministers’ Club facilitates personal relationships between elected representatives from EPODE Programmes and existing community-based programmes from international regions or countries interested in developing obesity-prevention strategies. Members of the Ministers’ Club includes elected representatives such as ministers and secretaries (health, sports, urbanism, education, agriculture…), members of parliaments, governors, and mayors of cities involved in community-based childhood obesity-prevention programs.

=== EPODE Ministers' Club leadership ===
- José Ángel Córdova President of EPODE Ministers' Club - 2013
- John Hill (Australian politician)

== See also ==
- Bariatrics
- Classification of childhood obesity
- Obesity and walking
- Social stigma of obesity
- World Fit - A program of the United States Olympic Committee (USOC), and the United States Olympians and Paralympians Association (USOP)
- Bioelectrical impedance analysis – A method to measure body fat percentage.

== Bibliography ==
- Borys J, Valdeyron L, Levy E, Vinck J, Edell D, Walter L, Ruault du Plessis H, Harper P, Richard P, Barriguette A (March 18, 2013). "EPODE – A Model for Reducing the Incidence of Obesity and Weight-related Comorbidities". European Endocrinology. 9 (2): 116–20. doi:10.17925/EE.2013.09.02.116. PMC 6003578. PMID 29922365.
- Gracia-Marco L, Vicente-Rodríguez G, Borys JM, Le Bodo Y, Pettigrew S, Moreno LA (April 2011). "Contribution of social marketing strategies to community-based obesity prevention programmes in children". International Journal of Obesity. 35 (4): 472–479. doi:10.1038/ijo.2010.221. PMID 20975724.
- Kettaneh A, Oppert JM, Heude B, Deschamps V, Borys JM, Lommez A, Ducimetière P, Charles MA (April 2005). "Changes in Physical Activity Explain Paradoxical Relationship Between Baseline Physical Activity and Adiposity Changes in Adolescent Girls: The FLVS II Study". International Journal of Obesity. 29 (6): 586–593. doi:10.1038/sj.ijo.0802992. PMC 2043091. PMID 15889117.
- Romon M, Lafay L, Bresson JL, Oppert JM, Borys JM, Kettaneh A, Charles MA (August 17, 2004). "Relationships between physical activity and plasma leptin levels in healthy children: the Fleurbaix–Laventie Ville Santé II Study". International Journal of Obesity. 28 (10): 1227–1232. doi:10.1038/sj.ijo.0802725. PMID 15314633.
