= Obesity and the environment =

Environmental factors affecting the incidence of obesity

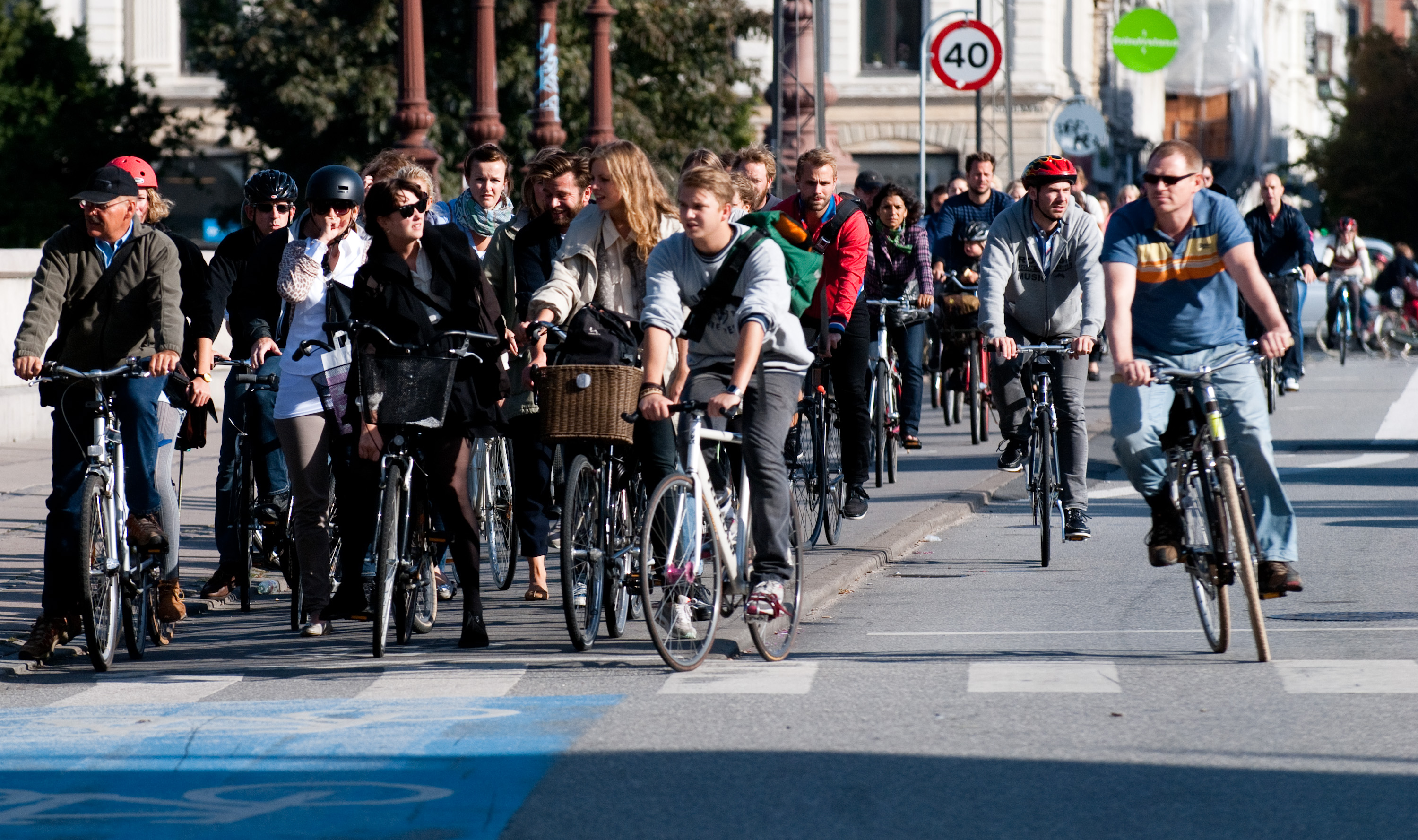
Rush hour in Copenhagen, where 62% of the population commute by bicycle to their work or study places each day

Obesity and the environment aims to look at the different environmental factors that researchers worldwide have determined cause and perpetuate obesity. Obesity is a condition in which a person's weight is higher than what is considered healthy for their height, and is the leading cause of preventable death worldwide. Obesity can result from several factors such as poor nutritional choices, overeating, genetics, culture, and metabolism. Many diseases and health complications are associated with obesity (e.g., Type-II diabetes, heart disease, cancer, stroke). Worldwide, the rates of obesity have nearly tripled since 1975, leading health professionals to label the condition as a modern epidemic in most parts of the world. As of 2022, worldwide population estimates of obese adults are near 13%; overweight adults total approximately 39%.

== Environmental obesogens ==
Studies have shown that obesity has become increasingly prevalent in both people and animals (pets and laboratory animals). Proper diet and exercise is not linked to lower obesity rates or the trending toward obesity despite these being the assumed cure and preventative for obesity. According to Professor Robert H. Lustig from the University of California, San Francisco, "[E]ven those at the lower end of the body mass index (BMI) curve are gaining weight. Whatever is happening is happening to everyone, suggesting an environmental trigger." The theory of environmental obesogens proposes a different causal facet to obesity – that lifetime exposure to xenobiotic chemical obesogens, molecules that do not properly regulate lipid metabolism in the body and may cause obesity, changes the body's metabolic system. Data is scarce, but some in-vitro studies have found this model could be an accurate predictor of future obesity. A study suggested that smoking before and during pregnancy, for example, increases the risk of obesity twofold in children of school age.

Many chemicals in common-use products are known or suspected to be obesogens and act as endocrine disruptors in the body. In a University at Albany, State University of New York study, organotin compounds, toxic chemicals derived from tin and hydrocarbon substituents, were found in a designer handbag, vinyl blinds, wallpaper, tile, and vacuum cleaner dust collected from 20 houses. The study linked obesity to phthalates, present in many PVC items, in addition to scented items like fresheners, laundry products, and personal care products. Also linked is Bisphenol A (BPA), a known environmental obesogen that reduces the body's overall number of fat cells but which makes remaining fat cells larger. Additionally, glucose intolerance and more abdominal fat were found to be the results of obesogens in animals and the long-term effects of low-birth weight babies. The study strongly indicates that obesogens change an individual's metabolic set points for gaining weight.

Research on obesogens indicate some endocrine disrupting chemicals (EDCs) belong to this class of compounds. Bruce Blumberg, a professor of developmental and cell biology at UC Irvine, has found compelling evidence that exposure to the chemical Tributyltin (TBT), a compound used in pesticides, can trigger fat cell creation.

As several cases have confirmed, farm workers in America have unwillingly or unknowingly worked in fields that had been recently sprayed with TBT and other dangerous chemicals. Among a wide variety of health risks, farm workers may bear a disproportionate risk of exposure to such obesogens. While legislation has been enacted to require a minimum amount of time to pass before workers enter sprayed fields, the lack of legal and political power of many farm workers combined with the fact that enforcing such laws can be difficult, makes exposure to obesogens a possible threat to the livelihood of many farm workers.

== Location ==
=== Obesity by country ===
The country to country rates of obese adults in a total population vary due to different environments, lifestyles, and diets. While there is no direct correlation between obesity rates and economic status, wealthier countries have more resources to utilize for health and fitness awareness. According to World Population Review, in 2022 all of the top ten countries with the highest percentage of obese adults are found in the South Pacific. Several theories attempt to explain this fact, including the popularity of unhealthy fast food, the use of frying as a means to prepare food, and possible genetic predispositions. In contrast, the country with the lowest percentage of total obese adults is Vietnam, with only 2.1%, attributed to chronic food insecurity and child malnutrition.

Highest Number of Obese Adults by Country	Obese Adults in Population (%)
Nauru	61
Cook Islands	55.9
Palau	55.3
Marshall Islands	52.9
Tuvalu	51.6
Niue	50
Tonga	48.2
Samoa	47.3
Kiribati	46
Micronesia	45.8

In the United States, the prevalence of obese adults in the mid-1990's was substantially lower than current figures. In 1994, the prevalence of obesity in every state was less than 22%, but by 2000, 11 states (Alabama, Arkansas, Kentucky, Louisiana, Michigan, Mississippi, Missouri, South Carolina, Tennessee, Texas, and West Virginia) had surpassed that figure. Six states had a population percentage of obese adults of more than 30%; the remaining states ranged between 20% and 30%. By 2015, no state had a prevalence of obesity under 18%; almost all states exceeded 22%, and six states exceeded 26%. According to the Centers for Disease Control and Prevention (CDC), in 2016 the number of obese people in the United States reached an all-time high of about 93 million, up 33% from 2008. By 2020, the U.S. obesity prevalence was 41.9%, an increase from 30.5% in 2017 to 41.9% in 2020. During the same time, the prevalence of severe obesity increased from 4.7% to 9.2%.

== Race ==
=== Race and genetics ===
Race and genetics are two other dimensions of obesity that have been extensively studied. Some researchers have found that genetics increase the likelihood of occurrence of obesity through higher levels of fat deposition and adipokine secretion. Other critics suggest that race itself may affect the way obesity presents itself in individuals. In a recent study of 70,000 men and women of African ancestry, researchers found three new common genetic variants. These single-nucleotide polymorphisms (SNPs) are connected to body mass index (BMI) and obesity. Therefore, individuals who carry these variants are more at risk of becoming obese. Researchers noted that these genetic variants are very small determinants in most cases of obesity. Most medical professionals agree that environmental factors, poor health, and eating habits are still considered to be the strongest contributors of obesity.

One study found that Black men and women have a lower percentage of body fat than White men and women with the same body mass index (BMI). A similar study concluded that obese Black adolescents had significantly less dangerous visceral fat than obese White adolescents. This finding is significant because visceral fat has been more strongly linked to the risk of disease compared to fat stored in other parts of the body.

Between 1980 and 2000, obesity rates in the United States doubled among young children and tripled among teens. Numerous studies aimed to provide insight into genetic, economic, and/or environmental causes of obesity. According to the "thrifty gene hypothesis, a genetic theory explaining rising obesity rates, certain individuals are genetically predisposed to metabolize food more efficiently than others as a result of human evolution. In times of scarcity, these genes were essential in ensuring survival; in times of abundance, these same genes cause obesity. In first-world countries like the United States, the UK, Australia, and most Western European countries, evolution has led to an increased sedentary lifestyle and high rates of sugar and fat consumption, directly leading to obesity.

=== Race and food deserts ===
According to the CDC, studies show that members of racial and ethnic minority communities are disproportionately obese. Hispanics (47%) and non-Hispanic Blacks (46.8%) had the highest age-adjusted prevalence of obesity compared to non-Hispanic Whites (37.9%) and non-Hispanic Asians (12.7%). A similar study in the American Journal of Public Health found a strong correlation between community demographics and the likelihood of obesity: Hispanics (28.7%) and non-Hispanic Blacks (36.1%) evidenced higher percentages of obesity than non-Hispanic Whites (24.5%) and non-Hispanic Asians (7.1%). Many theories exist to explain these disparities, including differing dietary behaviors among ethnic groups, differing cultural norms in regards to body weight and size, and unequal access to healthy foods. Due to economic factors, many Hispanics and non-Hispanic Blacks rely on cheap calories with little nutritional value. According to television broadcast statistics, Hispanic and Black teens and children are specifically targeted by fast food restaurants. Spanish-language TV advertisement has increased by 8%, and restaurants such as KFC and Burger King have increased their spending on Spanish advertisements from 35% to 41% while decreasing English-language advertising.

The Department of Agriculture defines food deserts as neighborhoods without ready access to fresh, healthy, and affordable food. Communities suffering in food deserts are more likely to be Hispanic and Black neighborhoods, limiting available healthy food options. In 2015, Chicago's Mayor Emmanuel partnered with Growing Power, which transported affordable fresh fruits and vegetables to food desert areas. In 2004, Pennsylvania enacted a $100 million economic stimulus package that subsidized grocery stores by offering a low-cost business loan from the Fresh Food Financing Initiative (FFFI) if they were located in a food desert. In 2008, former New York City Mayor Bloomberg introduced the Green Cart amendment, which allowed pushcart vendors to receive a low-cost permit if they were willing to operate in under-served neighborhoods. The Green Cart program projected an improvement in the health of 75,000 New Yorkers, and save at least 50 lives a year over the long term.

Hispanic and Black communities frequently have less access to exercise and fitness opportunities (i.e., public parks) as well as healthy green spaces which creates a obesogenic environment. Low income neighborhoods are burdened with an abundance of fast food outlets. A 2005 study conducted in Chicago found that Black neighborhoods had 14 fast food restaurants per 100,000 neighborhood residents, while White neighborhoods had 9.4 fast food restaurants per 100,000 residents. Fast food restaurants offer inexpensive, calorie-dense food that is nutrient-poor and unhealthy with high levels of sugar, fat, and sodium. According to the USDA recommendation for daily caloric intake, a McDonald's meal has more than half a day's worth of calories. In the short term, the residents of these communities are making an economically rational decision when purchasing fast food as it is easily accessible and inexpensive. The alternative would be purchasing low quality groceries at a high cost. In the long-term, however, studies show that the consumption of fast food hurts overall health, raising the probability of becoming obese.

Economic status of individuals in ethnic groups does not fully explain the disparity between communities. A 2009 study in the Journal of Epidemiology and Community Health found that racial/ethnic minorities have a higher risk of being obese within each observed socioeconomic group, suggesting that race is a key indicator in determining disparities of obesity risk. The study also implies that structural racism may cause certain racial/ethnic groups to experience a disproportionate risk of obesity.

== Social perspective ==
=== Weight bias and stigma ===
Weight bias is an ongoing field of study focusing on obesity-related stigmatization. Multiple academics cite evidence of differential, negative treatment of the overweight and obese due to commonly attributed stereotypes such as laziness, incompetence, weakness of will, sloppiness, and untrustworthiness.

In one study of 2,249 obese and overweight women, 54% reported experiencing weight stigma by their colleagues; 43% reported experiencing weight stigma by their superiors. Weight stigma can be defined as derogatory comments, preferential treatment towards average-weight colleagues, and denial of employment. In another study of 2,838 nationally representative adults aged 25–74, overweight, obese, and severely obese respondents were, respectively, 12, 37, and 100 times more likely to report employment discrimination than average-weight respondents, including loss or reduction of wages. Data suggests that after controlling for other socioeconomic factors, limitations of health, and other household variables, obese men were expected to see a 0.7 to 3.4% wage depression, and obese women were expected to see a wage depression between 2.3 and 6.1%.

Studies show that physicians are most likely to attribute lack of motivation as the primary cause of obesity, coupled with non-compliance and general laziness. In one United Kingdom study, physicians tended to follow a victim-blaming approach regarding the causes of obesity, while the obese patients themselves attributed their weight to specific medical causes or other socioeconomic factors, such as low income. Disparities in perceived causation are a major hindrance towards physicians' and patients' abilities to create and maintain a balanced obesity management plan.

Educational weight bias also presents in the correlation between obesity and educational attainment. A study of over 700,000 Swedish men found that, after controlling for intelligence and parental socioeconomic levels, those who were obese at the age of 18 had a lower chance of going to college than their average-weight peers. Similarly, a study based on data gathered by the National Longitudinal Study of Adolescent Health concluded that obese women were 50% less likely to attend college than their average-sized peers. Female students who attended school where most of the females were obese, however, had a relatively similar chance of attending college as non-obese women.

Weight bias, fat stigma, and discrimination are factors that many academics say can contribute to hopelessness and depression, encouraging the same unhealthy habits that initially caused obesity.

=== Relation to mental health ===
Scientific and healthcare communities agree that obesity and mental illness are directly related. Awareness of the complicated relationship between these health concerns will develop solutions that are as of yet inaccessible. Patients assessed for obesity need to be examined with respect to their mental health status. Public health policies should recognize frequently paired mental illness and weight-related disorders and their influence on and from cultural, gender, socioeconomic, and other health elements. Policy and training should also highlight the likelihood of the obese developing mental health co-morbid disorders, and vice versa. Training health professionals with a focus on interventions, support, prevention, and collaboration with related specialties is crucial.

Obesity is a chronic health condition associated with extreme conditions in mental health. A variety of psychological disorders or mental illnesses such as eating disorders (anorexia, bulimia, binge-eating disorder), schizophrenia, bipolar disorder, and depression/anxiety, are associated with an increased risk of obesity and other obesity-related illnesses like diabetes and coronary heart disease. A 2014 study of over 10,000 people suffering from schizophrenia, bipolar disorder, or depression showed that 80% of the participants were overweight or obese. Psychological issues obesity can trigger include low self-esteem, distorted body image, and body shaming. Obese individuals tend to have higher rates of depression than those who are not obese. Research at the University of Wisconsin-Madison by Dr. David A. Kats and his colleagues indicated that of the 2,931 patients tested exhibiting chronic health conditions, clinical depression was highest in extremely obese patients (patients with a BMI over 35). A Swedish Obese Subjects (SOS) research study indicated that clinically significant depression is about three- to four-times higher in severely obese individuals than in those who are not obese. Professor Marianne Sullivan and her team from Sahlgrenska University Hospital noted that obese subjects exhibited depression scores similar to patients living with chronic pain.

== Access to space ==
Children tend to be less active when their communities lack safe play areas and after-school programs regardless of their community's socioeconomic status. Rates of after-school program participation are low across all socioeconomic groups; current research shows that this may be due to external factors other than willingness or a need to participate. Research indicates children that come from high socioeconomic households typically do not participate in after-school programs because they are already involved in a wide range of extra-curricular activities. Children that come from low-socioeconomic households, however, typically do not utilize play spaces and after-school programs due to lack of ability and frequently a lack of transportation. The CCLC, an after-school program serving low-income youth, conducted a survey in which 20% of youth responders cite transportation, rather than a lack of interest or willingness, as the primary reason they do not attend after-school programs. Additionally, parents of low-income and minority youth are less likely to have easy access to after-school programs as compared to high-income and White parents.

Disadvantaged youth and young adults face similar problems with transportation to safe and engaging spaces. Poor youth are less likely to have access to a car, and more likely to live in high crime neighborhoods, making it difficult to take public transportation or walk. Additionally, children from disadvantaged families often have more worries and less free time to exercise, as they struggle alongside family members to find ways to meet their basic needs. By contrast, privileged families have the financial means and time to take their children to playgrounds, after-school activities, competitive sports, and more.

== Access to technology ==
Children of higher-class families have more access to technology and tend to make less use of the "environmental space" of their everyday life; such technology removes opportunities for youth outdoor interaction. Children with frequent access to technology tend to spend more time indoors engaged with a computer/television screen rather than playing outdoors. In this sense, technology is a detriment to children as it frequently hampers physical activity, thus negatively impacting a child's health. This issue contradicts the belief held by many in the United States that children who come from high-income homes are less likely to become obese as they can be active in safe environmental spaces.

Technology also plays a detrimental role for adults who spend most of their time working on a computer. Economists from the Milken Institute, working with statistics from the United States, correlated a 10% increase in the sale of technology with a 1.4% increase in obesity rates – approximately 4.2 million people in a country with the same population as the United States. This increase in time spent using technology not only absorbs time potentially spent being active, it also changes the way people eat. Employees may feel pressured while at work and may eat hurriedly or absentmindedly; once home, workers frequently turn on the TV or engage in their mobile phones instead of focusing on their food consumption and diet. Ross DeVol, a chief research officer at the Milken Institute, quipped: "Common sense says if you sit around in front of the screen, don't exercise while you are working, change your diet...you are going to gain weight."

== Food access in the United States ==
=== Federal and national level studies ===
In 2009, the U.S. Department of Agriculture conducted a food desert study to examine the public's access to supermarkets. Evidence showed that 23.5 million people within the United States did not have access to a supermarket within a one-mile radius of their residence. More than 113 studies have been conducted to determine if healthy food and supermarkets are equally distributed and accessible to every socioeconomic class. Of these, 85% (97) of the studies found that supermarkets and healthy food stores are unequally distributed between different socioeconomic groups.

Other research teams have studied the comparison between supermarkets and smaller food outlets such as small grocery stores and convenience stores. They found that supermarkets were used as a proxy for food access as they provide the most reliable access to a wide variety of nutritious and affordable food. The study showed that low-income and minority communities had less supermarkets and more convenience and small grocery stores as compared to predominantly wealthy and White communities. 89 out of the 98 (90%) studies of national data indicated that urban areas have uneven geographic access to supermarkets.

National studies have concluded that ZIP codes composed primarily of low-income households are 25% less likely to have a chain supermarket store but contain 1.3 times as many convenient stores when compared to ZIP codes composed of middle-income households. ZIP codes composed of predominantly African-American households have about half the amount of chain supermarkets, as do ZIP codes composed of predominantly White households. An assessment of 685 urban and rural census tracts spanning three states show that low-income neighborhoods have approximately half as many supermarkets and four times as many small grocery stores when compared to high-income neighborhoods. The same study also found that predominantly White neighborhoods have four times as many supermarkets as predominantly African-American neighborhoods. Also, a study of 10,763 residences in four states reported the existence of supermarkets in the surveyed residential area was directly related with a 24% lower prevalence of obesity and a 9% lower prevalence of overweight residents.

=== Locally focused studies ===
Studies done at the local level demonstrate similar trends to those done at the national level. There are 2.3 times as many supermarkets per household in low-poverty areas in Los Angeles compared to high-poverty areas. Predominantly white regions have 1.7 times as many supermarkets as Hispanic regions, and 3.2 times as many as African-American regions. West Louisville, Kentucky, a low-income African-American community that suffers from high rates of diabetes, has one supermarket for every 25,000 residents; in comparison, the U.S. in total has an average of one supermarket for every 12,500 residents. In Washington, DC, the city's lowest income wards (Wards 7 and 8) have one supermarket for every 70,000 people, while two of the three highest-income wards (Wards 2 and 3) have one for every 11,881 people. One in five of the city's food stamp recipients lives in a neighborhood without a grocery store. Twenty-one studies have found that food stores in low-income communities are less likely to stock healthy or fresh food or snacks, and are instead more likely to offer lower quality items at higher prices, compared to food stores in predominantly white communities.

=== School nutrition legislation ===
The Child Nutrition and WIC Reauthorization Act of 2004 created the team nutrition network to promote healthy eating and physical activity in school-aged children, awarding grants to states that created healthy eating and physical activity programs for the children they serve. The CDC released its own guidelines for schools to promote physical and health education for schoolchildren, specifically suggesting that public and private schools:

1. Implement and evaluate healthy eating and physical activity policies and practices within their schools/Districts
2. Create supportive environments for healthy eating and physical activity
3. Provide healthy school lunches featuring appealing healthy food and drink choices in- and outside the provided lunch program
4. Establish physical education programs as a cornerstone of the curriculum
5. Implement health education to ensure students gain necessary knowledge of nutrition and fitness
6. Provide students with mental health and social services
7. Partner with families and community members to create and assess healthy eating and physical activities outside of school
8. Employ qualified professionals and provide staff with professional development opportunities in physical education, health education, nutrition services, and mental health

The 2010 Healthy Kids Act was part of Michelle Obama "Let's Move" program. This program authorized the USDA to regulate competitive food (i.e., any food that is not included in a school's lunch program, such as fast food and vending machines) and required more stringent nutritional standards for meals served in cafeterias. These nutritional standards were required to be scientifically founded and in compliance with the published Dietary Guidelines for Americans. Soon schools began to replace food which were high in fat and sodium, and any food that was lacking nutritional value, As replacements, schools implement more fruits, whole grain, vegetables, and low or nonfat milk into provided lunches. By 2014, assessments of the Healthy Kids Act indicated that school-aged kids were beginning to eat more fruits and vegetables while at school. One of these assessments included a Harvard study proving that after the Act was implemented, kids ate 16% more vegetables and 23% more fruit at lunch. The Act remains in place, but has not gone unchallenged: on 1 May 2017, Secretary of Agriculture Sonny Perdue signed a proclamation to make nutrition requirements for school meals more flexible. This includes restoring local control of guidelines on whole grains, sodium, and milk.

== Agricultural subsidies and the United States Farm Bill ==
Approximately once every five years, Congress drafts legislation known as the United States Farm Bill, an umbrella term containing different Bills affecting America's agriculture and food. The Farm Bill focuses on two major thrusts: food stamps and nutritional programs, and income and price supports for commodity crops.

The Farm Bill has been touted as one of the biggest contributors to the ongoing obesity epidemic. Over the past decade, the U.S. government's farm policy focused on the overproduction of and the reduction in prices of commodity crops such as corn and soybeans. Low commodity prices incentivize farms to create new ways to use these commodity crops. These subsidies caused a decrease in the prices of corn and soybeans, and led to the creation of high fructose corn syrup and hydrogenated vegetable oils – ingredients directly linked to obesity that are frequent components of many modern food products. In 1998, over 11,000 food products were introduced to Americans; of these, approximately 75% were candies, condiments, cereals, and beverages – all foods high in added high fructose corn syrup. Between 1974 and 2004, U.S. consumption of high fructose corn syrup increased over 1,000%. Agricultural subsidies in other countries also tend to favor energy-dense crops.

Unhealthy foods tend to be inexpensive when compared to their healthy counterparts. As fruits and vegetables are not subsidized, the real cost of such crops has risen nearly 40%. In contrast, the prices of soda, sweets, fats, and oils declined due to the Farm Bill's subsidy to farmers growing commodity crops. Currently, the least expensive food available is also the most caloric and the least nutritious: for example, a dollar's worth of cookies or potato chips yields 1200 calories, while a dollar's worth of carrots yields only 250 calories.

U.S. farmers feed commodity crops to livestock that provide the country with meat, milk, and other products. Essential nutrients are taken away when cows are fed corn and/or soybeans instead of a natural grass diet. A 2014 University of Utah study claimed that "grass-fed beef has been shown to be higher in health-promoting nutrients, omega-3 fatty acids, and cancer-fighting conjugated linoleic acid (CLA) than beef that is fed grain." Ultimately, the U.S. government provides the subsidy for grain-fed livestock that causes farmers who raise grass-fed livestock financial stress and competition problems; hence, the U.S. government is partially responsible for causing increased rates of obesity and its associated serious co-morbid health conditions/diseases in its citizens. The government works to lower these rates but does not ratify or eliminate the subsidies partially responsible for their increase. An example of attempts the U.S. government has made to combat obesity is the 2008 Farm Bill's funding of community gardens located primarily in low income neighborhoods. A Michigan study of 766 adults in low-income neighborhoods showed that community garden participants were 3.5 times more likely to consume fruits and vegetables at least 5 times each day, and to consume more than 1.4 times the amount of fruits and vegetables than those who did not participate in community gardening. In addition, children who participate in a community garden tend to eat healthier and become interested in farming and eating locally grown food.

The 2008 Farm Bill also attempted to lower the cost of purchasing vegetables; researchers found that lowering vegetable costs by just 10% increased produce purchases by low-income families by 7%.

== Food movement solutions ==
=== Food justice ===
The food justice movement works to address the obesity epidemic by promoting access to affordable and healthy food to communities. The New York-based non-profit organization Just Food defines food justice as "communities exercising their right to grow, sell, and eat healthy food." Underlying this discourse is the belief that healthy food is a right of every person, regardless of race, ethnicity, socioeconomic status, or community. As a potential remedy for obesity, food justice advocates support providing affordable, quality food through community supported agriculture and the slow food movement. Proponents seek to empower historically disadvantaged communities by advocating equal access to healthy food for all people. While commending the movement for making healthy food more accessible, critics of this discourse claim the movement does not call into question the structural dynamics that make obesity a likely risk for many people. In addition, critics claim the movement offers alternative food as a solution to obesity but does not consider how food itself is produced and who is involved in production and consumption decisions.

=== Food sovereignty ===
The food sovereignty movement seeks to increase empowerment fostered by the food justice movement by addressing structural issues of the food system. Leading food sovereignty organization Via Campesina defines food sovereignty as "[the] peoples', country's, or State Union's right to define their agricultural and food policy". Advocates believe that healthy food is a right of all people in every country, and that people should participate in food production and consumption decisions. To that end, the movement seeks to empower those most affected by the obesity epidemic by including them in the process of brainstorming and creating alternatives to the current food system.

== See also ==
- 15-minute city
- Active design – Building and planning promoting physical activity
- Healthy city – Concept in urban design for health
- Obesity and walking

Transport:

- Active mobility – Unmotorised transport powered by activity
- Automotive city – Urban planning prioritising automobiles
- Automobile dependency – Concept that city layouts favor automobiles over other modes of transportation
- Effects of the car on societies – Overview of the effects of cars on various societies
- Freeway removal – Replacement of motorways with pedestrian-friendly and urbanist land uses
- Health impact of light rail
- Human-powered transport – Transport of goods and/or people only using human muscles
- Road diet – Transportation planning technique
