= FLV (disambiguation) =

FLV is a Flash Video file format.

FLV may also refer to:

- Sherman Army Airfield (IATA airport code)
- Toyota FLV

== See also ==
- Feline leukemia virus (FeLV)
