= WDTC1 =

Protein found in humans

Identifiers
- Aliases: WDTC1, ADP, DCAF9, WD and tetratricopeptide repeats 1
- External IDs: MGI: 2685541; GeneCards: WDTC1
Available structures
PDB	Ortholog search: PDBe RCSB
PDB	List of PDB id codes 3I7N

Gene location (Human)
Chr.	Chromosome 1 (human)
Band	1p36.11	Start	27,234,632 bp
Band	1p36.11	End	27,308,636 bp

Gene location (Mouse)
Chr.	Chromosome 4 (mouse)
Band	4|4 D2.3	Start	133,019,770 bp
Band	4|4 D2.3	End	133,080,792 bp
RNA expression pattern
Bgee	Human / Mouse (ortholog); Top expressed in: muscle of thigh; gastrocnemius muscle; pancreatic ductal cell; cardia; apex of heart; granulocyte; left ventricle; right auricle of heart; left testis; right testis / Top expressed in: muscle of thigh; neural layer of retina; spermatid; zygote; spermatocyte; granulocyte; ankle joint; seminiferous tubule; lip; extensor digitorum longus muscle; More reference expression data
BioGPS	n/a
Gene ontology
Molecular function	enzyme inhibitor activity; histone binding; histone deacetylase binding; protein binding
Cellular component	cytosol; nucleus; nucleoplasm
Biological process	regulation of cell size; negative regulation of catalytic activity; in utero embryonic development; negative regulation of transcription by RNA polymerase II; negative regulation of fatty acid biosynthetic process; protein ubiquitination; multicellular organism growth; glucose metabolic process; cellular response to insulin stimulus; cellular chemical homeostasis; post-translational protein modification
Sources:Amigo / QuickGO
Orthologs
Databases	NCBI: entry; OMA: entry
Species	Human	Mouse
Entrez	23038	230796
Ensembl	ENSG00000142784	ENSMUSG00000037622
UniProt	Q8N5D0	Q80ZK9
RefSeq (mRNA)	NM_001276252; NM_015023	NM_199306
RefSeq (protein)	NP_001263181; NP_055838	NP_955010
Location (UCSC)	Chr 1: 27.23 – 27.31 Mb	Chr 4: 133.02 – 133.08 Mb
PubMed search
- Wikidata
View/Edit Human	View/Edit Mouse

WD and tetratricopeptide repeats protein 1, also called "adipose homolog", is a protein that in humans is encoded by the gene WDTC1. It is associated with obesity.

WDTC1 is a gene that codes for a protein acting as a suppressor in lipid accumulation. WDTC1 protein consists of seven WD40 domains, three transient receptor potential channel protein-protein interaction domains, DDB1 binding elements, and a prenylated C-terminus. Reduced expression or disruption of WDTC1 gene is associated with obesity, increased triglyceride accumulation, and adipogenesis. WDTC1 is a factor in a complex composed of DDB1, CUL4, and ROC1 that restricts transcription in adipogenesis.

== Model organisms ==
Studies of phenotype of mice showed that having a loss of an allele resulted in obesity and poor metabolic profiles. Transgenic expression of the WDTC1 gene in mice showed the opposite effect with mice having less adipose.
