= Bariatrics =

Branch of medicine that deals with the causes, prevention, and treatment of obesity

Bariatrics is a discipline that deals with the causes, prevention, and treatment of obesity, encompassing both obesity medicine and bariatric surgery.

== Terminology ==
The term bariatrics was coined around 1965, from the Greek root bar- ("weight" as in barometer), suffix -iatr ("treatment," as in pediatrics), and suffix -ic ("pertaining to"). The field encompasses dieting, exercise and behavioral therapy approaches to weight loss, as well as pharmacotherapy and surgery. The term is also used in the medical field as somewhat of a euphemism to refer to people of larger sizes without regard to their participation in any treatment specific to weight loss, such as medical supply catalogs featuring larger hospital gowns and hospital beds referred to as "bariatric".

== Bariatric patients ==
Being overweight or obese are both rising medical problems. There are many detrimental health effects of obesity: Individuals with a BMI (Body Mass Index) exceeding a healthy range have a much greater risk of medical issues. These include heart disease, diabetes mellitus, many types of cancer, asthma, obstructive sleep apnea, and chronic musculoskeletal problems. There is also a focus on the correlation between obesity and mortality.

Overweight and obese people, including children, may find it difficult to lose weight on their own. It is common for dieters to have tried fad diets only to find that they gain weight, or return to their original weight, after ceasing the diet. Some improvement in patient psychological health is noted after bariatric surgery. 51% of bariatric surgery candidates report a history of mental illness, specifically depression, as well as being prescribed at least one psychotropic medication at the time of their surgery candidacy.

== Methods of treatment ==
Although diet, exercise, behavior therapy and anti-obesity drugs are first-line treatment, medical therapy for severe obesity has limited short-term success and very poor long-term success. Weight loss surgery generally results in greater weight loss than conventional treatment, and leads to improvements in quality of life and obesity related diseases such as hypertension and diabetes mellitus. A meta-analysis of 174772 participants published in The Lancet in 2021 found that bariatric surgery was associated with 59% and 30% reduction in all-cause mortality among obese adults with or without type 2 diabetes respectively. This meta-analysis also found that median life-expectancy was 9.3 years longer for obese adults with diabetes who received bariatric surgery as compared to routine (non-surgical) care, whereas the life expectancy gain was 5.1 years longer for obese adults without diabetes.

The combination of approaches used may be tailored to each patient. Bariatric treatments in youth must be considered with great caution and with other conditions that may not have to be considered in adults.

Techniques used in bariatrics include bioelectrical impedance analysis, a method to measure body fat percentage.

== See also ==
- Food addiction
- Overeaters Anonymous

=== Related conditions ===
- Obesity, childhood obesity
- Classification of obesity, classification of childhood obesity
- Epidemiology of obesity, epidemiology of childhood obesity
- Obesity and walking
- Social stigma of obesity

=== Physiology ===
- Body fat percentage
- Relative Fat Mass (RFM)
- Steatosis (also called fatty change, fatty degeneration, or adipose degeneration)
- Subcutaneous fat
