= World Fit =

American physical fitness program

World Fit Foundation
- Type: Nonprofit organization
- Industry: Club
- Founded: 2009
- Headquarters: 151 Kahiki Drive Tavernier, Florida, U.S.
- Key people: Gary Hall Sr.,(Founder)
- Services: Training
- Website: www.worldfit.org

World Fit is a program of the United States Olympic Committee (USOC), and the United States Olympians and Paralympians Association (USOP) to promote physical fitness and the Olympic Games ideals to school children through kids fitness programs, school fitness programs, and childhood obesity programs. World Fit is part of the world's largest obesity-prevention network, EPODE International Network

== About ==
World Fit was founded by three Olympians:

- Gary Hall Sr., M.D., World Fit Executive Director, an Olympic swimmer
- Anne Cribbs, an Olympic swimmer
- Dick Fosbury, an Olympic track and field athlete.

World Fit promotes youth fitness programs and Olympic ideals under the Olympic Charter to middle school fitness programs for children by having Olympic Games athletes and Paralympic athletes act as role models for fitness.

United States Olympic athletes and Paralympic athletes adopt schools for life, promote a culture of health and fitness for children, inspire students about the importance of health & fitness, and promote the Olympic values of perseverance, respect and fair play.

Approximately 7,000 USA Olympians and Paralympians are recruited by the USOP to adopt at least one school, and speak annually to its students about the importance of physical fitness activities & a healthier lifestyle, and promote school walking programs.

The Olympic athletes and Paralympic athletes encourage the students to participate in the World Fit Walk, which is held each spring on the school’s campus, where the students, teachers and family walk daily for six weeks.

The University of Miami's Miller School of Medicine department of pediatric research provides studies and outcome analysis of the World Fit program.

== See also ==
- EPODE International Network, the world's largest obesity-prevention network
- President's Council on Fitness, Sports, and Nutrition
- Presidential Champions Award
- The President's Challenge
