= Oslo breakfast =

School meal

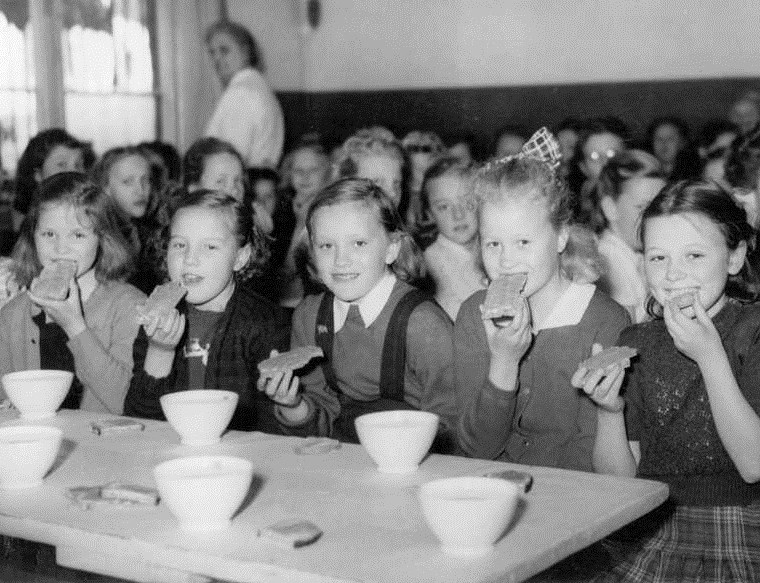
Oslo breakfast at a primary school in Oslo in 1952

The Oslo breakfast was a type of uncooked school meal developed in the 1920s and rolled out as a free universal provision for Oslo school children in 1932. It typically consisted of bread, cheese, milk, half an apple and half an orange.

== Ingredients ==
While there was some variation in the meal, its typical ingredients included:

- Two slices of wholemeal bread (Kneippbrød) spread with margarine
- A slice of cheese
- Half a pint of milk
- Half an apple and half an orange

Extra ingredients might include slices of raw uncooked vegetable, such as carrots or swedes. Between autumn and spring, a dose of cod liver oil could be included.

== History ==
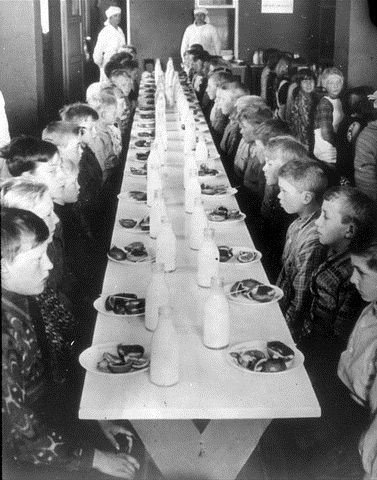
Children at a school in Oslo

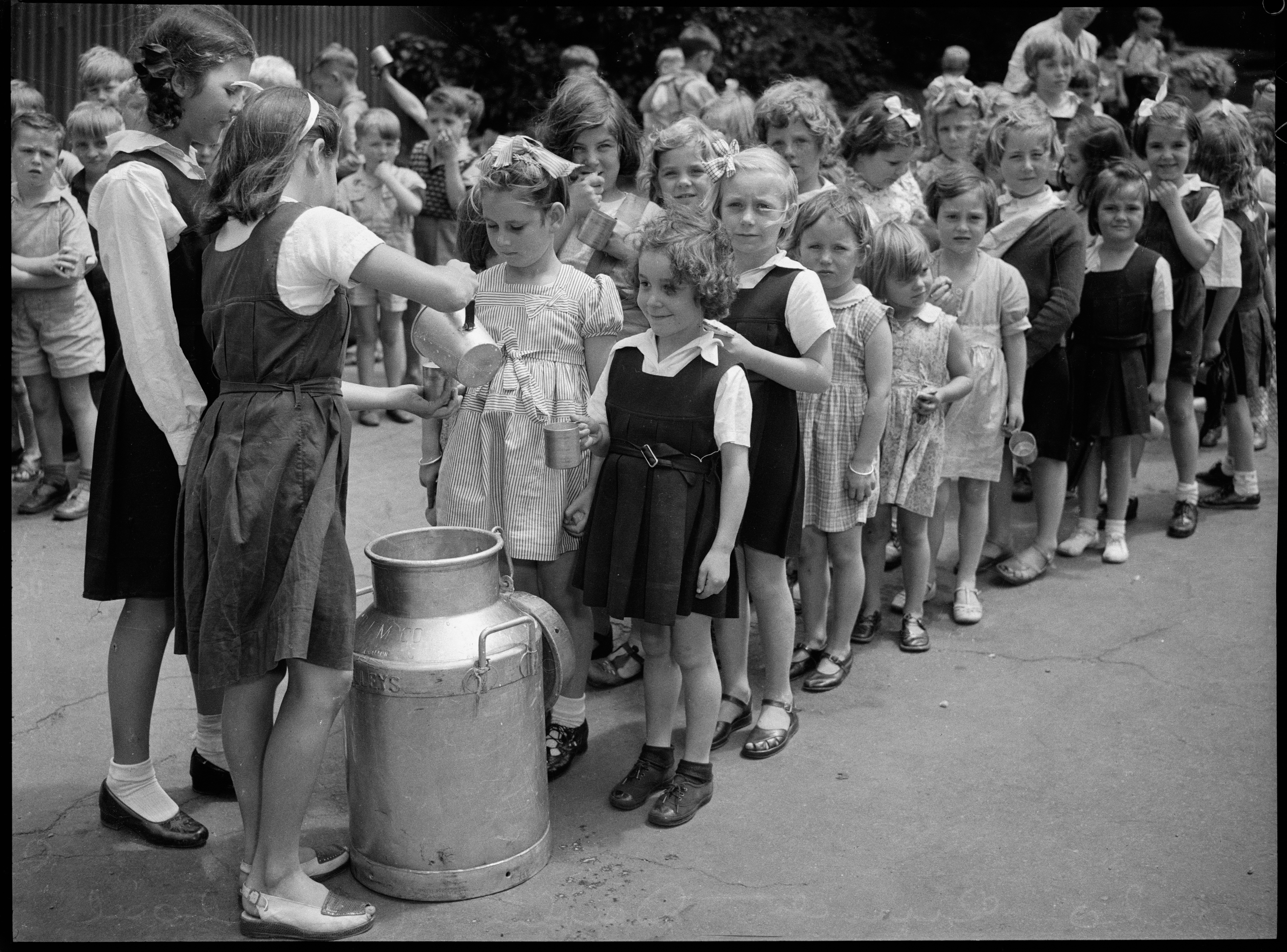
Children queuing for Oslo Breakfast, 11 February, 1950, Sydney, Australia

The earliest known modern advocate for school dinners was Count Rumford, who oversaw a program to feed and educate children in late eighteenth-century Germany.

Carl Schiøtz designed the Oslo breakfast. He was also a senior official in the Oslo municipal authorities, which helped him achieve the practical implementation of his ideas. By 1932, the city was providing the Oslo breakfast to all primary school children. Later, older children were also given the meal. It was provided free of charge to all, to prevent poor children from being stigmatized if they had to apply to get it at no cost.

The Oslo breakfast was the most famous of a number of similar worldwide developments in the 1920s and 1930s, for governmental and educational authorities to provide school children with more nutritious food. Perhaps the second most famous example was Lord Boyd-Orr's work in Scotland, which showed the benefits of giving school children free milk – this led to universal school milk provision across Scotland and later the whole of Great Britain.

From the 1930s to 1950s, programs based on the Oslo breakfast soon spread to other Norwegian cities, across Scandinavia, the rest of Europe, and to the wider world, including Australia and Canada. As an example of the positive reports from trials of the breakfast, Jack Drummond of London University said that after 130 poor children had been fed on the breakfast, effects had been "remarkable". The children had lost the poor skin conditions common at the time, and had enjoyed a 25% gain in height over those not having the breakfast.

The worldwide popularity of the Oslo breakfast reached its peak around the mid-1950s, and then began to decline. In some areas it had been introduced as a supplementary meal to school lunch, not as a replacement as had originally been the case in Oslo. Schools found that running two meal programs reduced teaching time, and chose to eliminate the breakfast rather than the more popular lunch. In the late 1950s the Oslo breakfast ceased to be provided in its home country; with Norway now much more prosperous, authorities saw no need to continue to provide free school meals. Norwegian parents took over, providing a packed lunch with similar ingredients to the original breakfast.

== See also ==
- List of breakfast topics
- School breakfast club
- School meals initiative for healthy children
