= Kneippen =

Coordinates: 58°35′03″N 16°09′31″E

Kneippen is an area in Norrköping, Sweden. It is named after an old bath that was inspired by the teachings of Sebastian Kneipp.

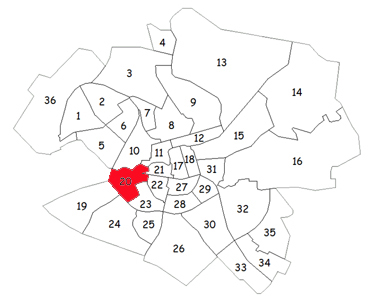

Kneippen has the highest house prices in the city.

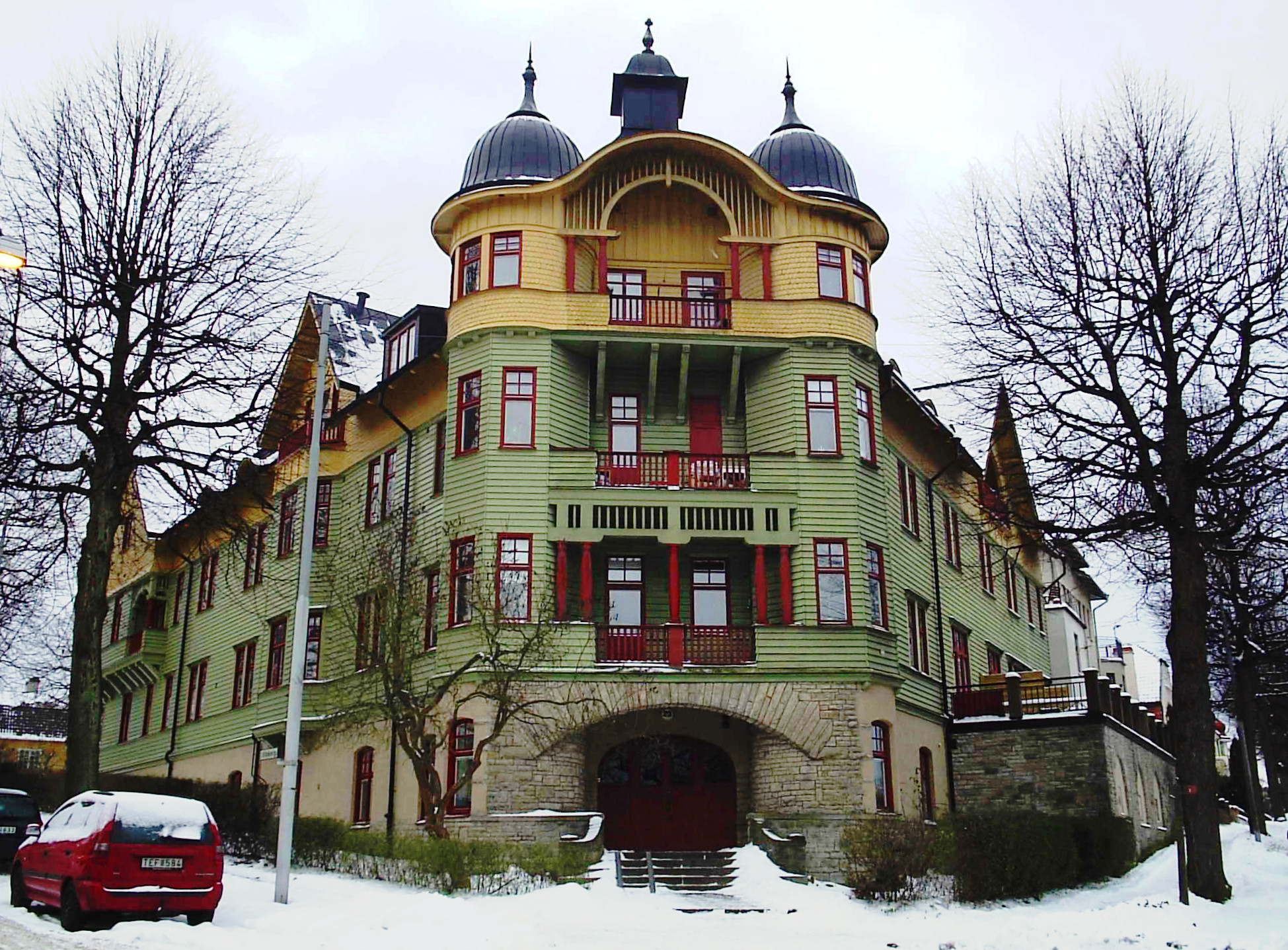

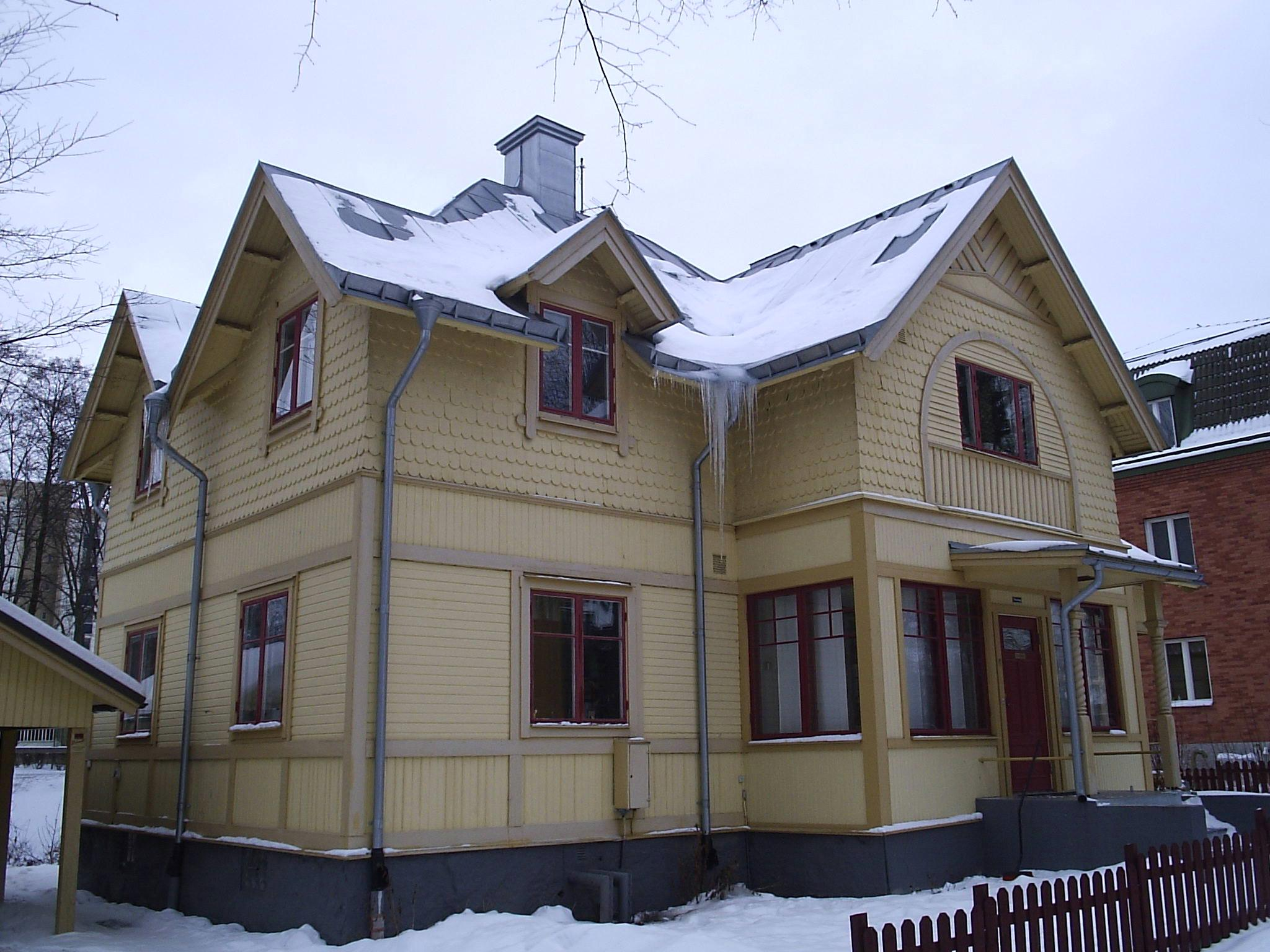

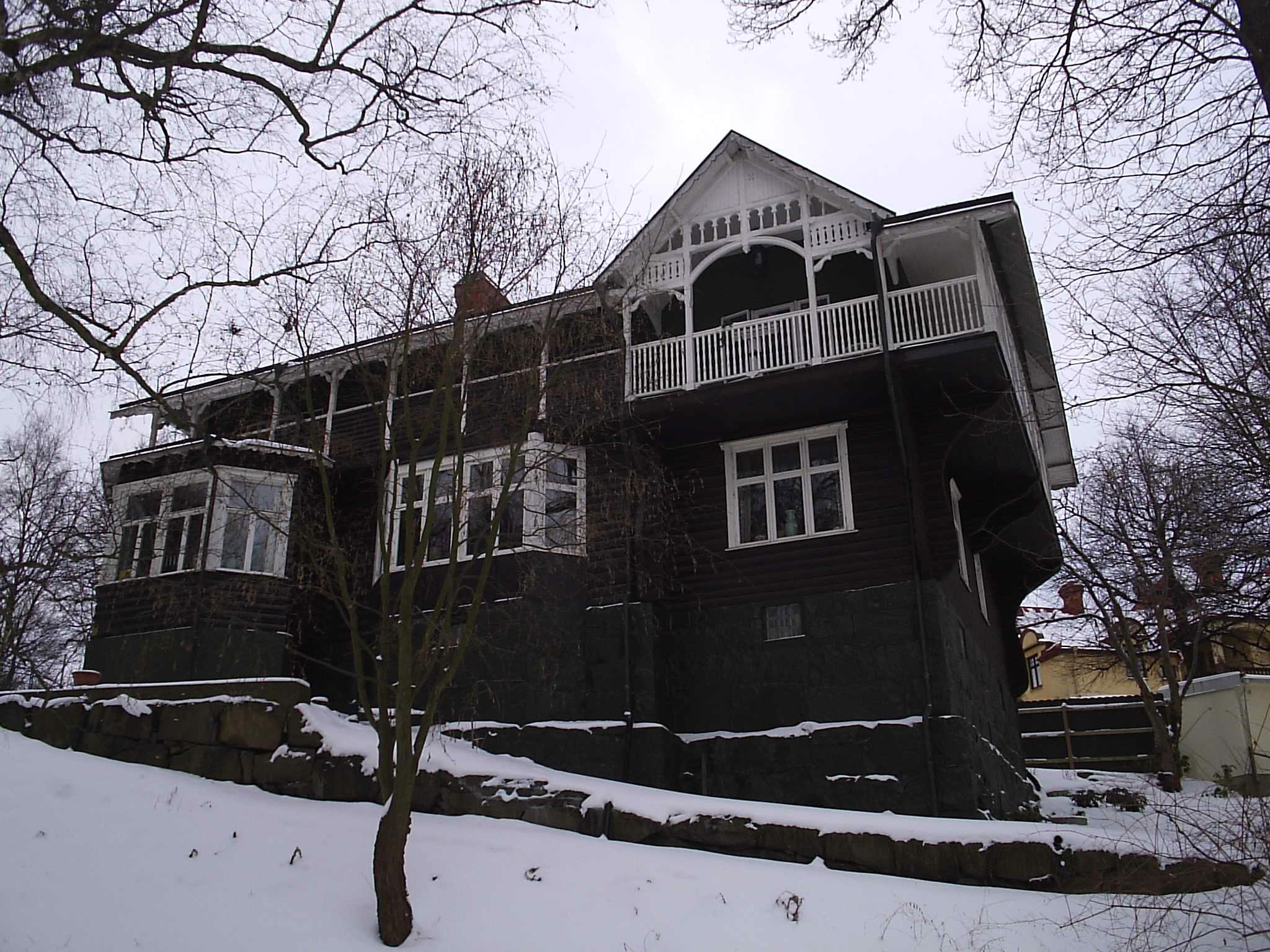

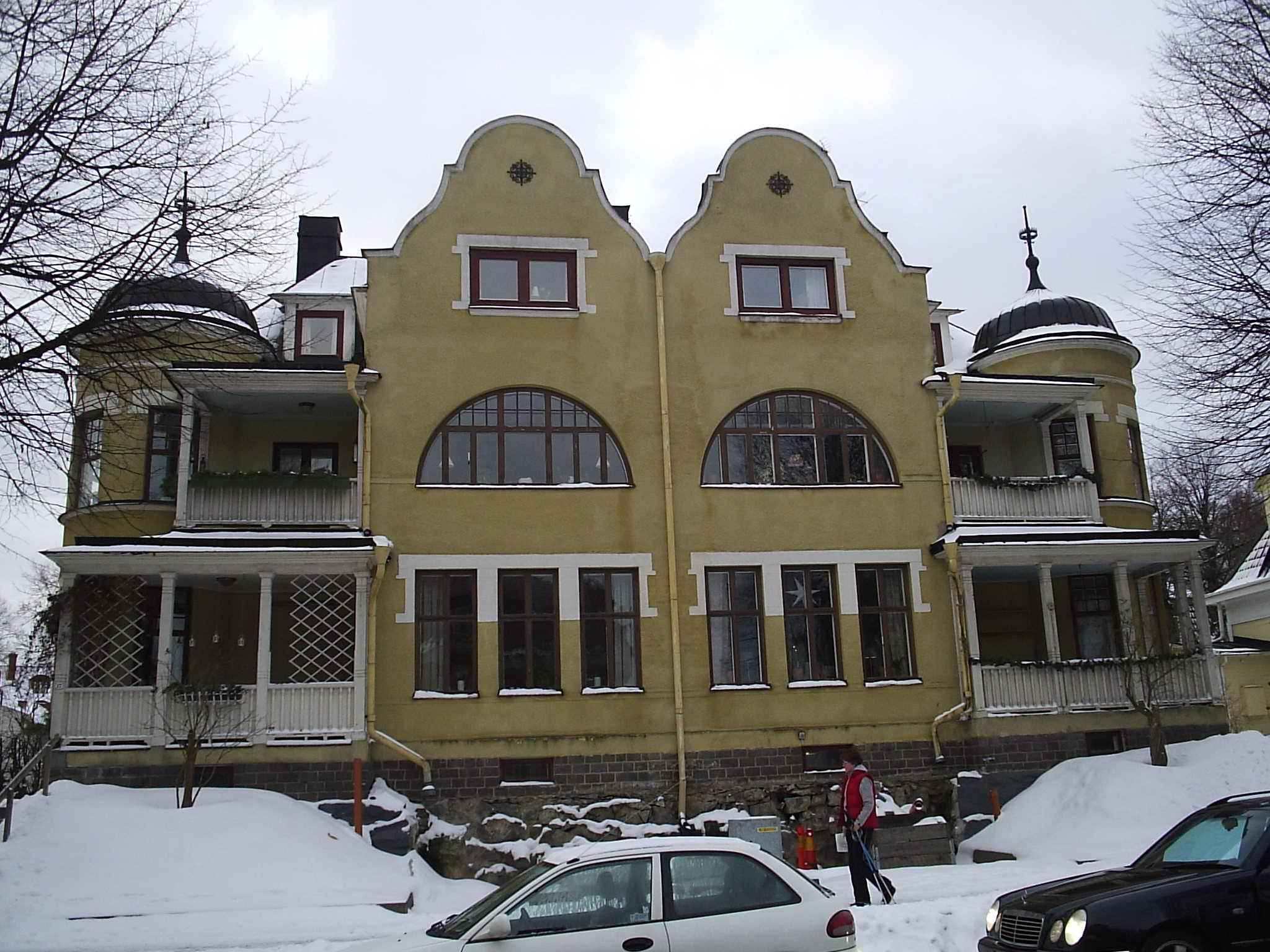

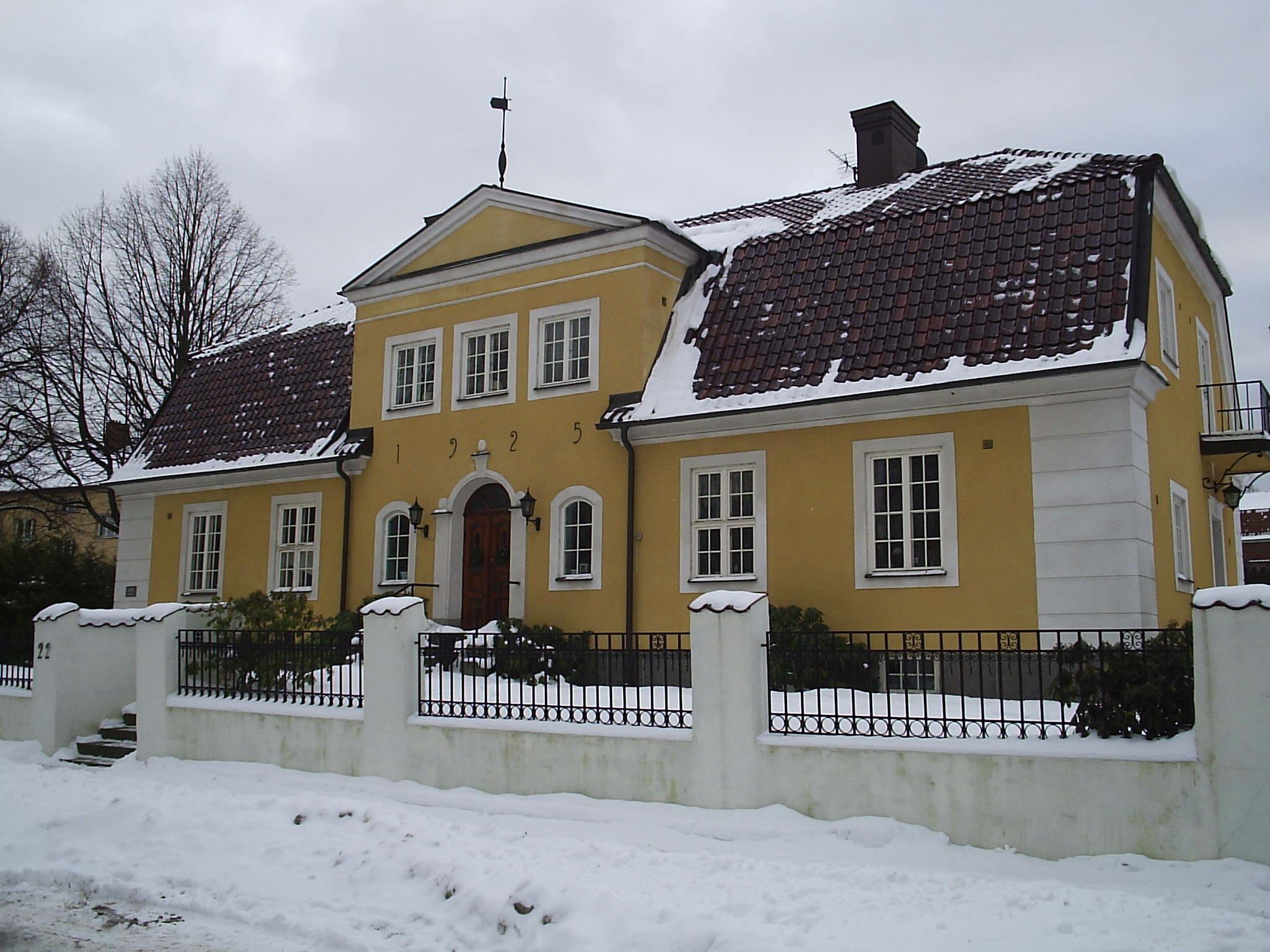

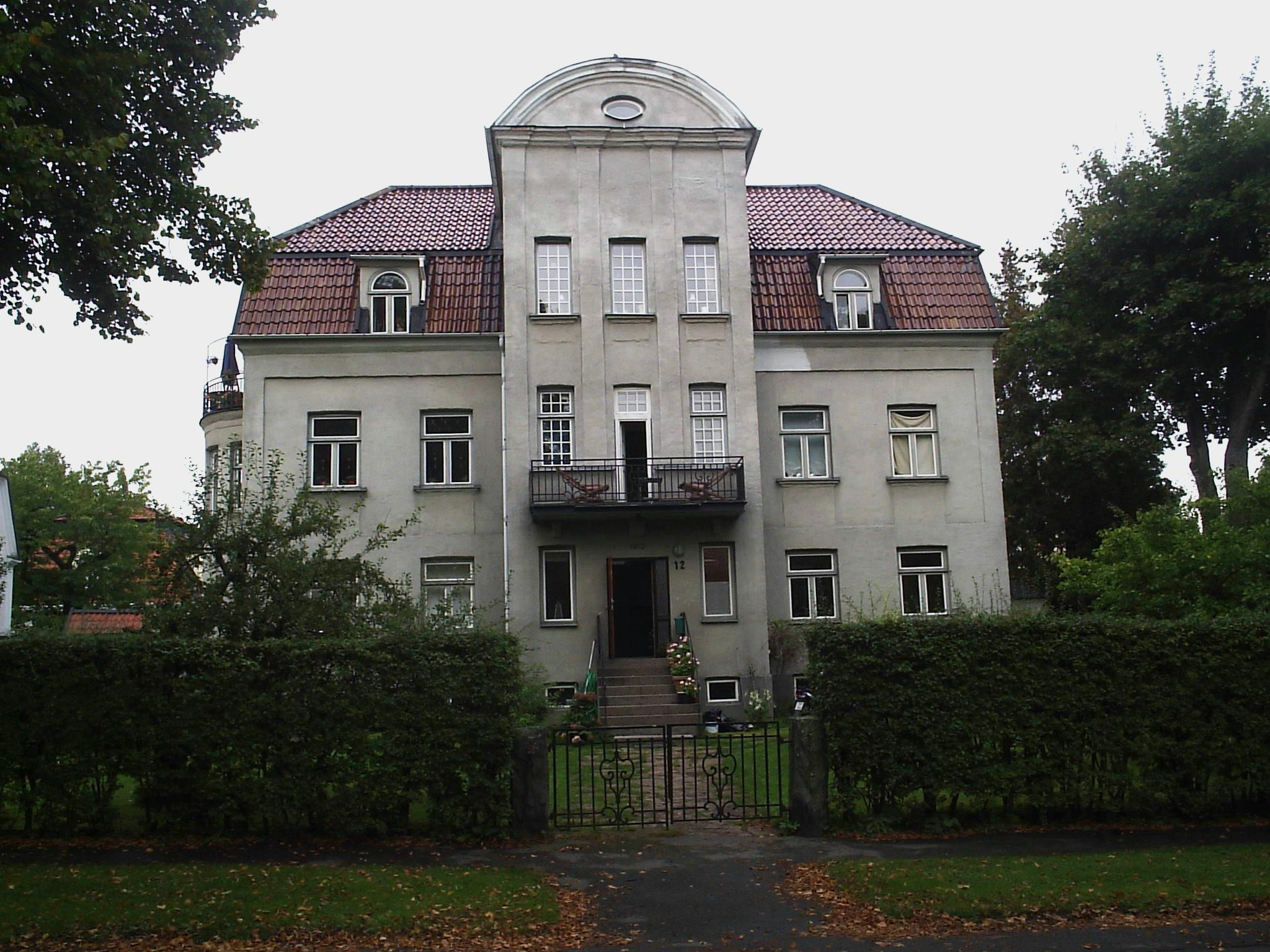

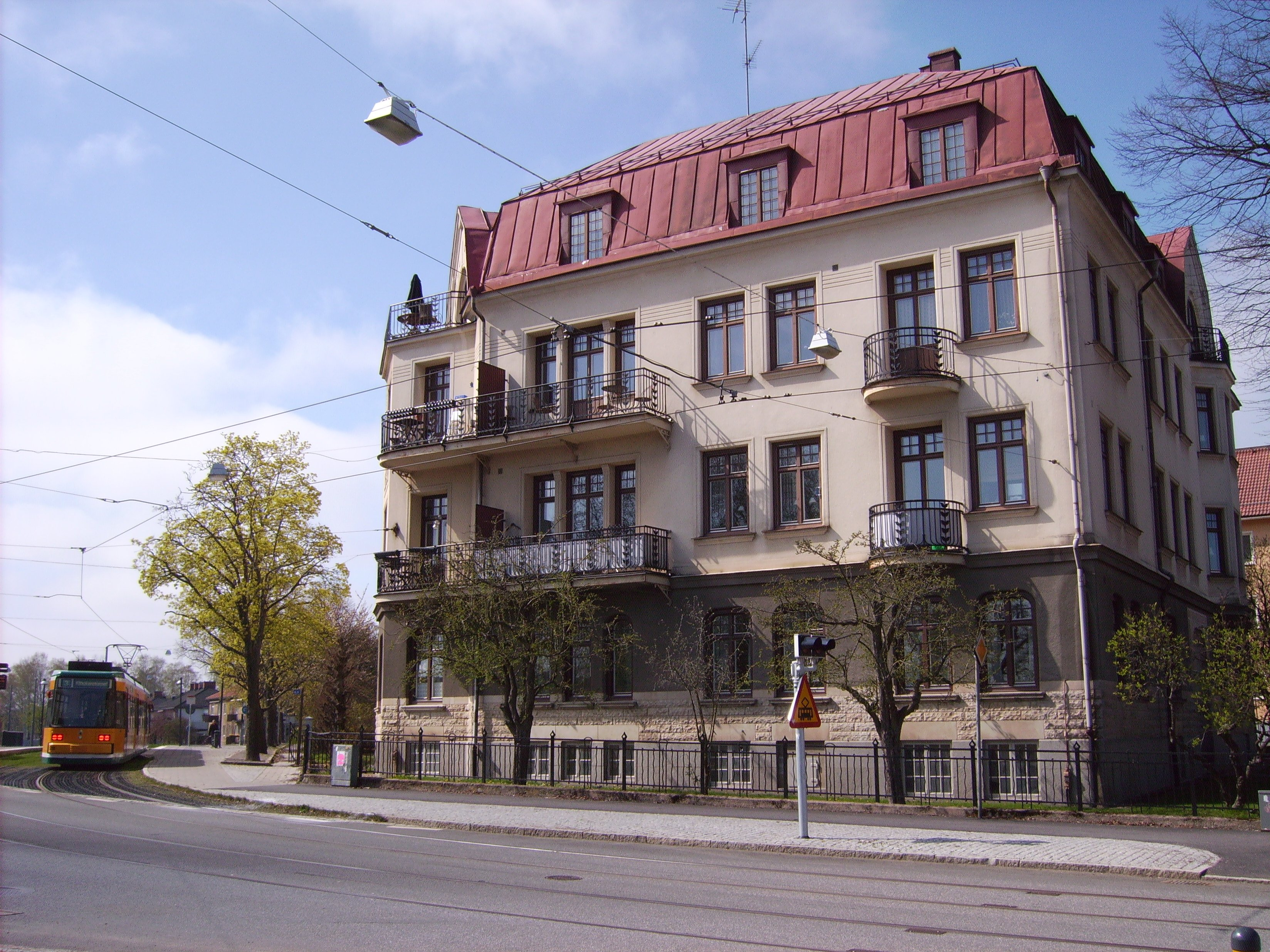

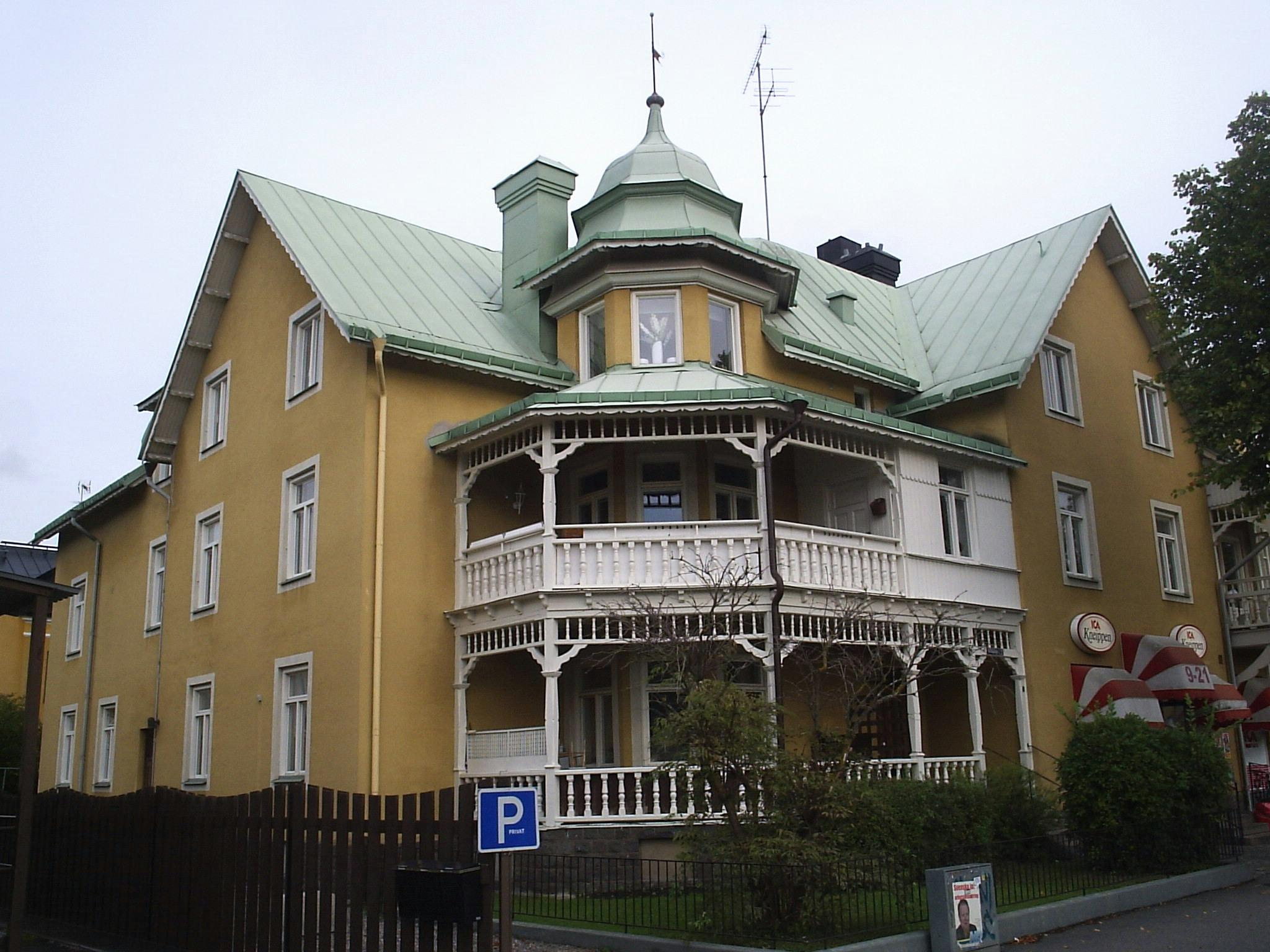
