= Sarah Wu =

American blogger and author

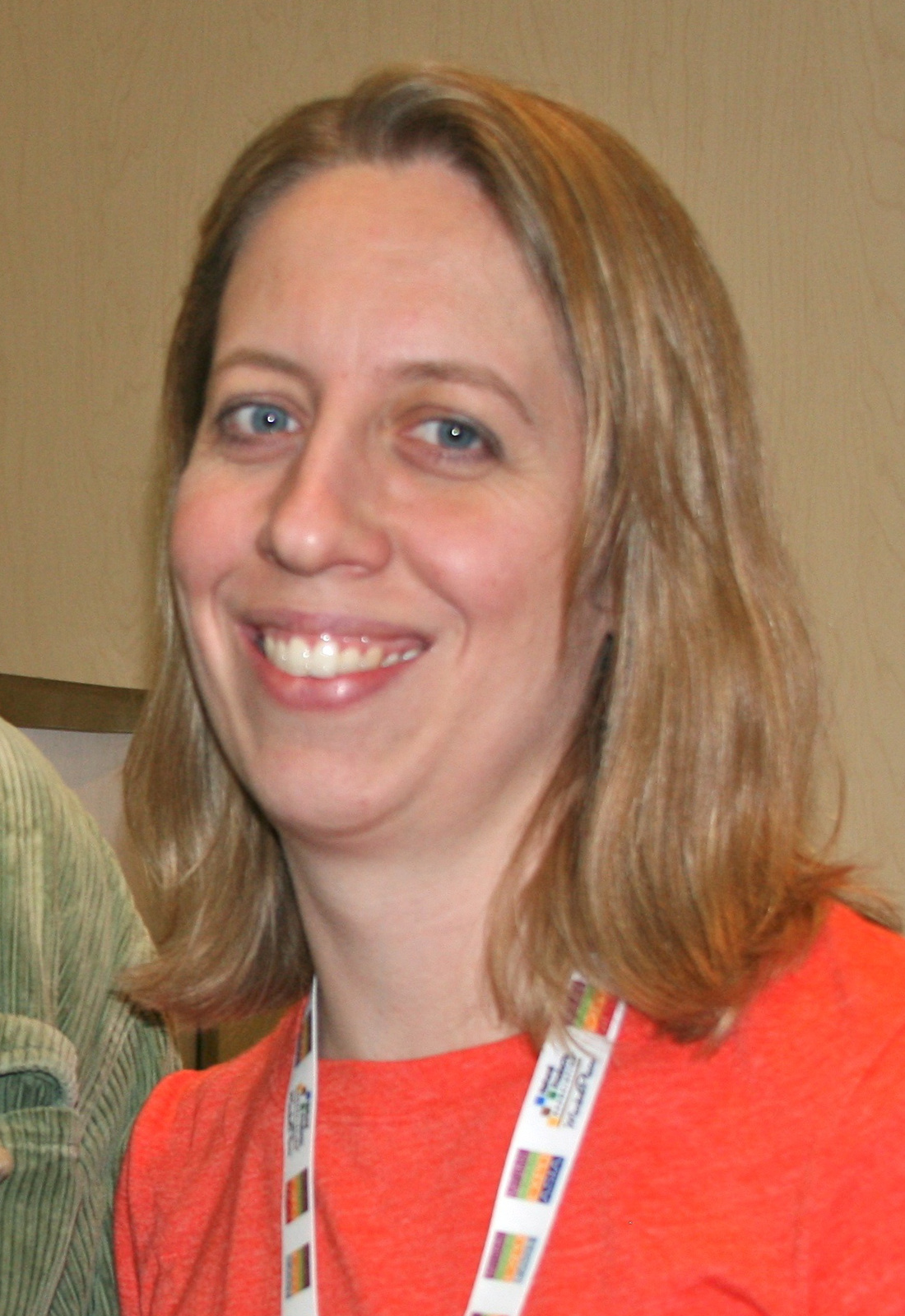
- Wu in 2012
- Born: 1977 (age 47–48)
- Occupation(s): speech-language pathologist, Blogger, Author
- Years active: 2010–present
- Spouse: Mike Wu

Sarah Wu (born 1977) is an American elementary school teacher who went undercover in 2010 to "raise awareness about school lunch food in America". Throughout 2010, Wu ate school lunch every day and anonymously documented the food being served via her blog at Fedupwithlunch.com. During the project, Wu was a teacher in the Chicago public school system and worked at Haugan Elementary.

== Mrs. Q ==
Wu is more widely known by her blog identity, Mrs Q. The idea for Mrs. Q came to Sarah Wu when she didn't have time to pack her own lunch. After buying lunch from her school's cafeteria, Wu was shocked to see what her students were being served. She then came up with the idea to eat lunch from her cafeteria every day for a year, and document it through an online blog. Each day during the 2010 school year, Wu lined up with students and bought her lunch. She would then take it back to her room, snap a photo of it on her desk, and upload the photo to her blog.
