= School breakfast club =

Program for children to eat breakfast before school

Children eating in a classroom in Maryland, United States, as part of an event to launch International School Meals Day on 8 Mar 2013. The Maryland class is video conferenced to a school in Ayrshire, Scotland, with some of their children visible on the screens. Both schools make provision for some of their children to have breakfast as well as lunch.

A school breakfast club is a provision for children to eat a healthy breakfast in a safe environment before their first class. The term "breakfast club" is commonly used to describe such facilities in the United Kingdom.

Breakfast clubs generally enhance both academic performance and behaviour, especially for children whose parents might not otherwise be able to afford to provide them with regular meals. Breakfast provision is however less prevalent compared with school lunch, both in the UK and worldwide. As of 2013, only about half the school children in the UK had access to a breakfast club.

Attendance of a breakfast club is not mandatory. The clubs are often run by schools, but can be community-run. Schools themselves are the most common location for breakfast clubs, but they can also be found in churches, community halls or even commercial premises. Breakfast clubs are sometimes open to children from more than one school.

== History ==
The earliest known modern advocate for school dinners was Count Rumford in the late-eighteenth century. School dinners became more widely available in the nineteenth and twentieth century, though generally only lunch was provided. This began to change after the introduction of the Oslo breakfast in 1932, an uncooked meal of nutritional ingredients. During the interwar years, the Oslo breakfast became famous worldwide; claims were widely reported that it helped children fed on it grow several inches taller than they would otherwise. Similar initiatives were launched in several countries across the world. In the United States, a major step forward in the provision of breakfast for schoolchildren was the 1966 launch of the School Breakfast Program.

In the United Kingdom, breakfast clubs were introduced in the 1990s, driven not just by concern for children's nutrition but by parental demand for a supervised place to leave their children in the early morning. Changes in gender roles and more demanding workplaces meant an increasing number of women were no longer able to look after their children until the start of school. By 1999, there were over 700 breakfast clubs operating in the UK. After the lasting global inflation in the price of food that began in late-2006, there were increased efforts to set up new breakfast clubs, in part due to greater awareness of children who arrived at school suffering from hunger, a condition that reduced their ability to concentrate and sometimes led to disruptive behaviour in the classroom. A 2011 report by Kellogg's found that the number of breakfast clubs had increased to over 20,000, though also that several thousand had or were at risk of closure due to lack of funds. In 2013, a survey of 552 staff for the Association of Teachers and Lecturers found that just over half those questioned said their school provided a breakfast club. The Conservative Party's UK general election manifesto of 2017 had included a promise to provide free school breakfasts to all primary school children, though by 2018; this had been abandoned. A commitment remains for the UK Government to provide £26,000,000 extra funding for new and existing breakfast clubs.

UK breakfast clubs were closed as part of the lockdown imposed for the COVID-19 pandemic. This was opposed to schools, which in the UK were left partly open, to cater for the children of key workers. A May 2020 report stated that 621,000 British children had been accessing free breakfast clubs before the pandemic, yet only 136,000 were receiving an alternative during the lockdown. In 2024, the Labour Party announced plans for fully-funded breakfast clubs at all UK primary schools.

== Structure ==
There is no standard model for a breakfast club. Some are run by and located in schools. Others are run by community groups, businesses or churches, or by a combination. Some clubs make a small charge for breakfast, providing them free only to those who qualify for free school meals. Other clubs provide free breakfasts for all children, to avoid those from poor families suffering from stigmatization. Breakfast clubs typically stay open for between 45 minutes to 1 hour 15 minutes, and close before the children's first morning lesson. Sometimes the clubs are staffed by volunteers, though sometimes there are paid caterers, and clubs in schools can be supervised by teachers or support staff.

== Benefits ==
Breakfast clubs can be especially valuable for children whose parents are not able to afford to provide them with regular morning meals. They can provide both short- and long-term health benefits. Children who receive breakfast often perform better at learning, and can also be better behaved. Breakfast clubs can also improve the child's long-term health by providing a well balanced nutritious meal. Secondary benefits of breakfast clubs include improving attendance, helping to prevent disadvantaged children from experiencing social isolation, and helping with children who would otherwise not have adult supervision in the first hour or so before school. A significant majority of teachers hold the view that school breakfast clubs are beneficial in achieving educational goals. For example, in a 2013 survey of 552 teachers, 387 (71%) said they believed breakfast clubs have a positive effect on pupil's concentration, but four teachers (0.7%) said it had a negative impact. Questioned about the impact on behaviour, 325 (60.2%) were positive, while 11 (2%) said breakfast clubs have a negative effect.

Various studies in both the U.S. and Europe, some dating back to the 20th century, found that breakfast provision at schools boost pupil's educational attainment. Older studies have been criticised for their methodology. Some studies found evidence of negative behaviour effects, and that in certain circumstances a majority of children were unhappy with breakfast clubs: when either there was insufficient care given to ensure the clubs were stimulating enough to avoid boredom, or when access had been restricted just to poorer children, which could leave participants feeling picked on.

== By location ==
=== Canada ===
School breakfast programmes in Canada are supported by the Breakfast Club of Canada.

=== United Kingdom ===
The UK government operates a national school breakfast programme (NSBP) for schools in deprived areas, although this is scheduled to end in July 2026. Schools which take part in the programme receive a 75% subsidy for the food and delivery costs of the club, and they are required to contribute 25% of costs themselves. Government requirements state that all pupils in participating schools must be offered breakfast supplies at no cost to them or their parents. A replacement breakfast club programme is to be introduced from September 2026. Guidance, funding and general support for running breakfast clubs in the United Kingdom are also available from a number of sources, including from County Councils, the charity Magic Breakfast, and the food companies Greggs, Kellogg's and General Mills.

A 2016 report funded by the Education Endowment Foundation and the Department for Education, based on research by the National Children's Bureau and the Institute for Fiscal Studies, found that free school breakfast clubs can boost children's educational attainment by as much as two months. The study found the benefits arose not just from the eating of a nutritious breakfast, but from also from attending the club itself.

=== United States ===
In the financial year 2018, the balanced breakfast programme for school children in the United States, which by this point was managed by the United States Department of Agriculture, had expanded to 2.4 million children. Approximately 14.7 million students received free or reduced-price breakfasts in FY 2018 and 2019. These numbers were a significant increase from financial year 1989, when 3.8 million students received free or reduced price breakfasts on a given school day, and a total of 658 million school breakfasts were served. Federal spending on the school breakfast programme in the United States also increased by three percent in financial year 2019 compared to the previous fiscal year.

== See also ==
- Free school meal
- Hunger in the United Kingdom
- List of breakfast topics
- School meal
- School meals initiative for healthy children
