= Kneippbrød =

Whole wheat bread

- Type: Bread
- Created by: Sebastian Kneipp
- Main ingredients: Whole-wheat flour

Kneippbrød ("Kneippbread") is a whole wheat bread. It is named for Sebastian Kneipp (1821–1897), a 19th-century Bavarian priest and hydrotherapist. It is the most popular bread in Norway. In Norway, Kneippbrød must be made mostly from whole meal wheat flour and must weigh 750 grams.

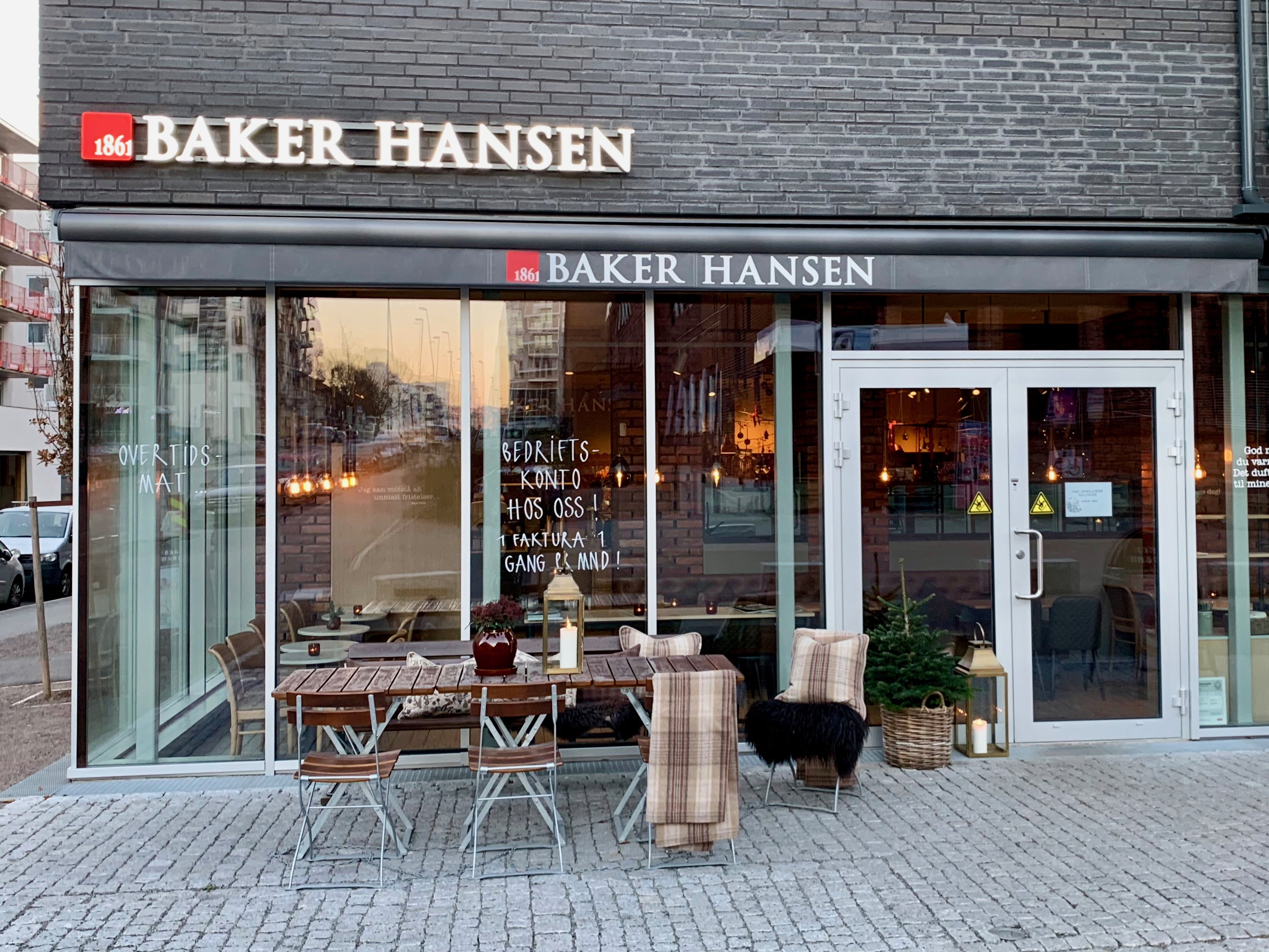
Baker Hansen at Løren in Oslo

== History ==
The publisher Søren Mittet first brought Dr. Kneipp's recipe to Norway, where the bakery Baker Hansen AS officially licensed it in 1895. The recipe and name were quickly copied. The official Oslo breakfast (Oslofrokosten) first prepared for Norwegian schools in 1929, employed a coarse form of the bread. According to FEDIMA, as of 2006, more than 60 million loaves were consumed annually.

== See also ==
- Sebastian Kneipp
