= Stephansried =

- Coordinates: 47°59′0″N 10°19′0″E
- Country: Germany
- State: Bavaria
- Admin. region: Swabia

Stephansried is a settlement in Ottobeuren, Germany.

== Location ==
It lies East from Memmingen.

== History ==
Stephansried was first mentioned in a document dated from 1083. There was a monastery South of the village. Its foundation document was signed on 31 December 1099 by Ottobeurer Dienstmann Hartnid von Stephansried. The parish church was built in 1494 on the territory of Ottobeuren monastery. 70 people lived here in 1564. There stood here 81 houses here in 1811, and its inhabitants’ number was 16.

In 1842 several buildings were destroyed, among them there was Sebastian Kneipp’s home as well.

== Famous persons ==
Sebastian Kneipp priest, naturopathist was born here on 17 May 1821.

== Gallery ==
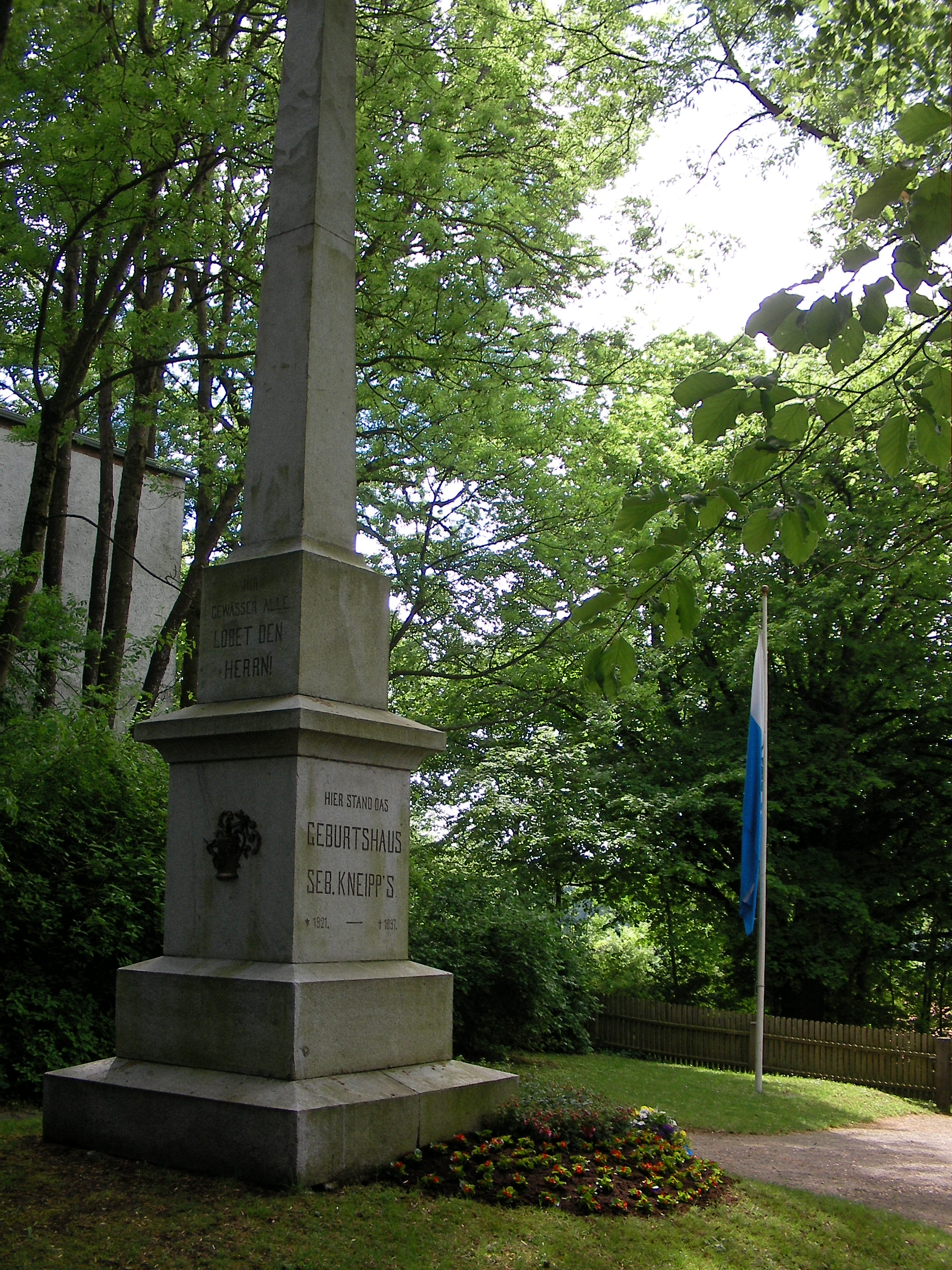
Memorial

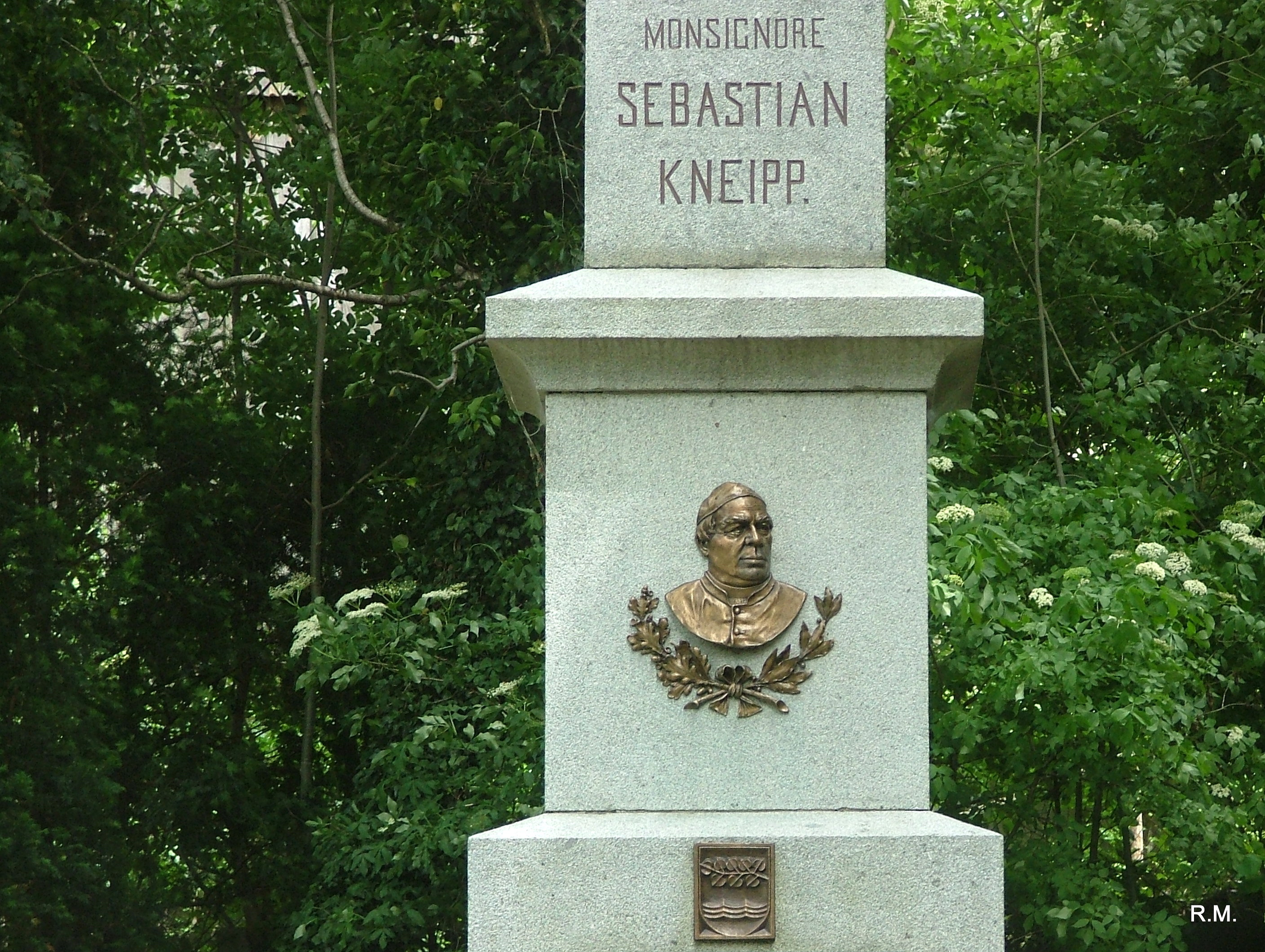
Kneipp Memorial

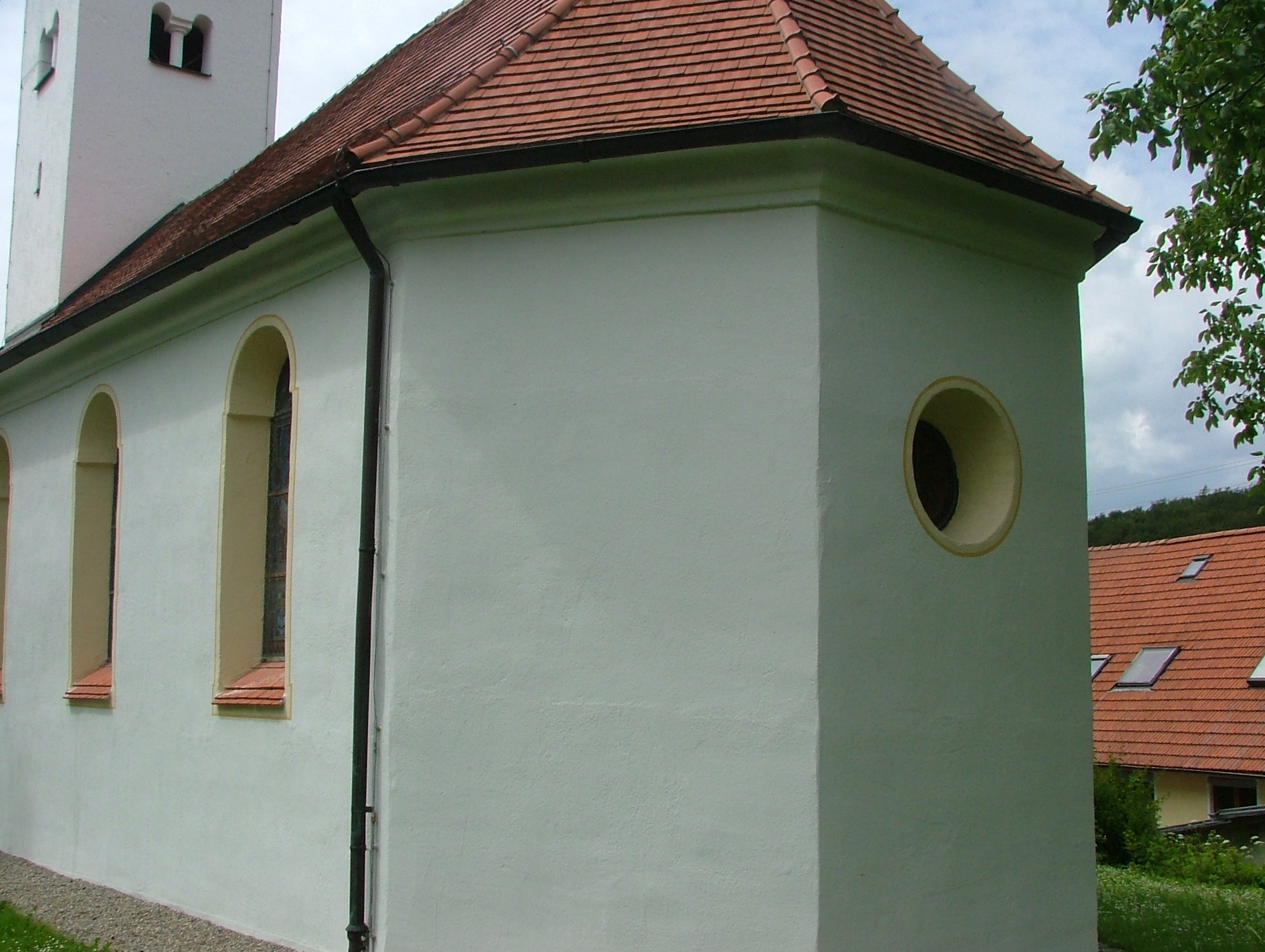
Church
