= FEDIMA =

European baking industry trade union

The Federation of European Union Manufacturers and Suppliers of Ingredients to the Bakery, Confectionery, and Patisserie Industries (French: Fédération des Industries de Matières Premières et Améliorants pour la Boulangerie et Confisserie dans la CEE) or FEDIMA is a European trade union within the baking industry. It was established 20 May 1969.

It is based in Brussels, Belgium. The current secretary-general is Jean-Christophe Kremer. They sponsor annual symposia.
