= Sebastian Kneipp =

19th-century German clergyman and health researcher

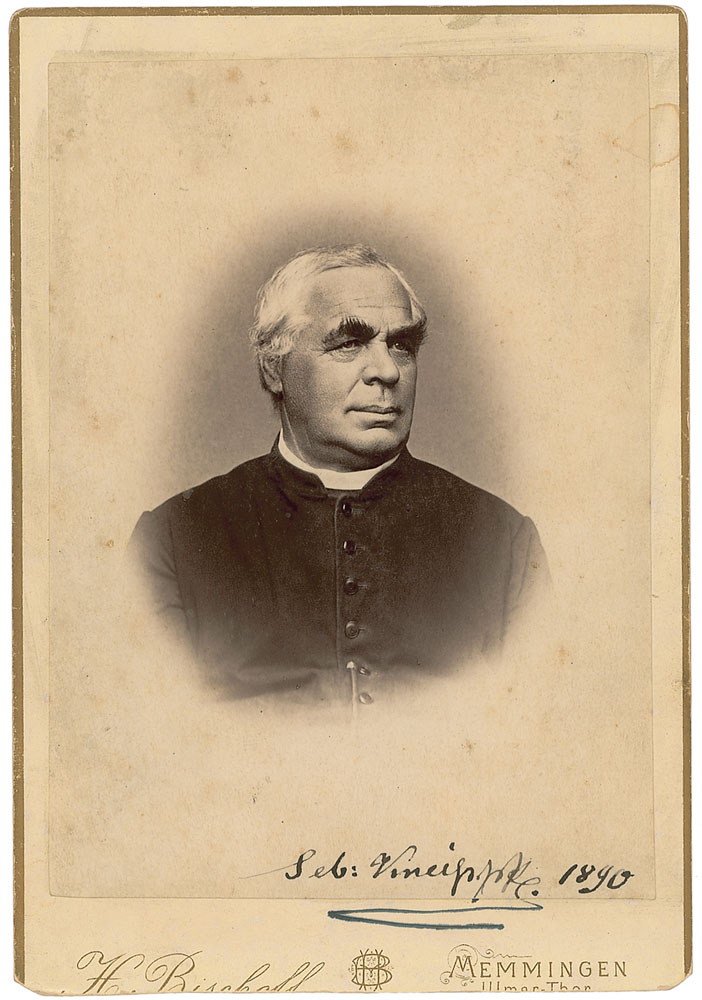
Kneipp in 1890

Sebastian Kneipp (German pronunciation: [zeˈbasti̯a(ː)n ˈknaɪp]; 17 May 1821 – 17 June 1897) was a German Catholic priest and one of the forefathers of the naturopathic movement. He is most commonly associated with the "Kneipp Cure" form of hydrotherapy (often called "Kneipp therapy" or "Kneippism"), the application of water through various methods, temperatures, and pressures, which he claimed to have therapeutic or healing effects, thus building several hospitals in Bad Wörishofen.

Although most commonly associated with one area of nature cure, Kneipp was the proponent of an entire system of healing, which rested on five main tenets:

- Hydrotherapy – the use of water to treat ailments
- Phytotherapy – the use of botanical medicines was another of Kneipp's specialties
- Exercise – promoting health of the body through movement
- Nutrition – a wholesome diet of whole grains, fruits, and vegetables with limited meat
- Balance – Kneipp believed that a healthy mind begets a healthy person

== Early life ==
Kneipp was born in 1821 in Stephansried in the Kingdom of Bavaria. His father was a weaver, and Kneipp trained as a weaver until he was 23 when he began training for the priesthood. Matthias Merkle, a priest in Grönenbach began instructing him, but Kneipp fell ill with tuberculosis in 1847. Kneipp was so ill that he was visited by a physician around 100 times in each of his last two years of study. While Kneipp was ill, he began reading many books and found his illness described in a book about water cures. In 1850, Kneipp met a student in the Georgianum seminary in Munich that was also ill and shared water cures with him. Both Kneipp and his friend at the Georgianum recovered from their illnesses and with his renewed health Kneipp was able to complete his studies. He was ordained as a Catholic priest in 1852.

== History ==
=== Background ===
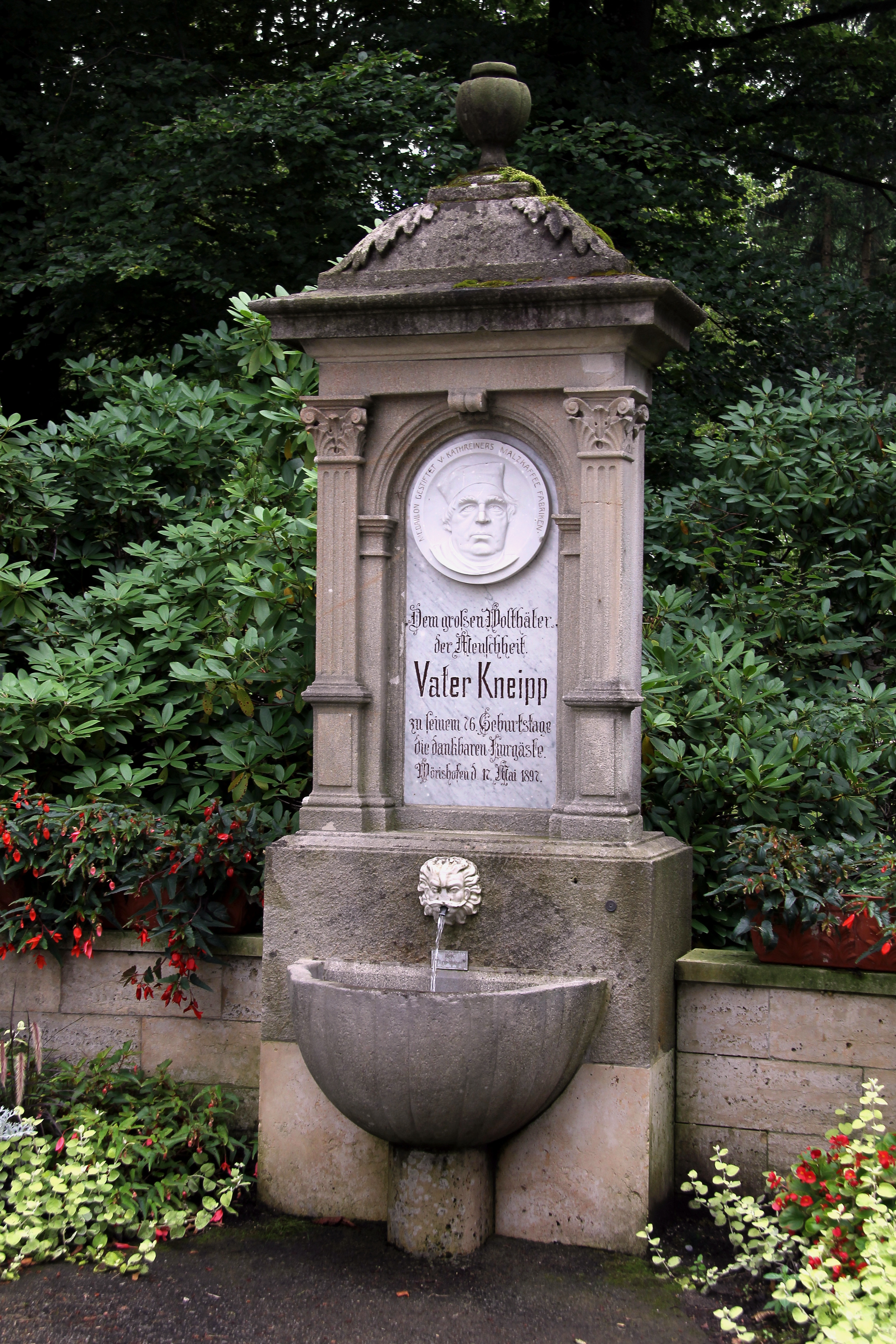
Fountain at the spa gardens of Bad Wörishofen, dedicated to pastor Sebastian Kneipp for his 76th birthday

In the 19th century, there was a popular revival in the application of hydrotherapy, instigated around 1829 by Vincent Priessnitz, a peasant farmer in Gräfenberg, then part of the Austrian Empire. This revival was continued by Kneipp, "an able and enthusiastic follower" of Priessnitz, "whose work he took up where Priessnitz left it", after he came across a treatise on the cold water cure. At Wörishofen, while serving as the confessor to the monastery, he began offering treatments of hydrotherapy, botanical treatments, exercise, and diet to the people who lived in the village. Some of his suggested treatments included "ice cold baths and walking barefoot in the snow" and other "harsh" methodologies. In 1893, M. E. Bottey described Kneipp's water cures as "dangerous in most cases". Wörishofen became known as a place with a reputation for spiritual healing. In addition to "peasants", Kneipp's clients also included Archduke Franz Ferdinand of Austria and his father, Archduke Karl Ludwig as well as Pope Leo XIII. Others took Kneipp's processes back to their home countries to found alternative therapy spas and colleges.

=== Hydrotherapy ===
Kneipp began developing his healing methods in 1849 after contracting tuberculosis and experimenting with the water treatments developed by Sigmund Hahn. After being ordained in 1852, he continued to experiment with water treatments in his parish. Kneipp began working with the cures developed by Vincenz Priessnitz but developed a more complex and gentle method. His gentle cures contrast the earlier water cures that he referred to as horse cures for their strenuous nature. Kneipp's treatment of patients also contrasted that of hospital medicine because it was personalized and took into account the patient's individual strengths and weaknesses.

Kneipp's approach comes from his theory that all diseases originate in the circulatory system. This theory is similar to humoral theory. Like those who believed in humoral theory, Kneipp asserted that breathing miasmatic or excessively hot air would lead to disease. While it may deal with one humor instead of four, his theory still asserts that an imbalance in the blood whether it be circulation or foreign matter is the root of disease. Under Kneipp's depiction of disease, water cures work by affecting the blood. They dissolve foreign matter, cleanse the blood of this matter, aid in circulation, and strengthen the body as a whole.

=== Lifestyle ===
In addition to specific cures, Kneipp had prescriptions with regard to food, drink, and clothing. He believed that food should be dry and simple and should not be spicy. He also believed that people should drink primarily water but also allowed consumption of alcohol in moderation. As for clothing, Kneipp preferred self-spun clothing made of linen or hemp over wool.

=== Personal ideology ===
Kneipp's approach to medicine was not independent of his Catholic faith. His focus on water and herbs stems from the idea that remedies are naturally provided by God. His emphasis on plain food, drink, and clothing comes from the theory that humans should live in accord with nature. He used scripture as well as references to Roman practice to support the reasoning behind his cure and admitted that his treatments did not fall in line with current scientific understanding. The fact that his treatments were not based in scientific theory did not bother Kneipp because they were seen as able to succeed where scientific medicine could not.

Sebastian Kneipp had a particular dedication to helping the poor and those that physicians can't help. His suffering early in life caused Kneipp to develop a deep sympathy for those less fortunate than him. He turned down many patients that could feasibly recover on their own but claims to have never refused to treat a patient that is poor or untreatable by other methods.

=== Publications ===
Kneipp's book My Water Cure was published in 1886 with many subsequent editions, and translated into many languages. He also wrote "Thus Shalt Thou Live", "My Will", and The Care of Children in Sickness and in Health.

== Legacy ==
Kneipp expanded the definition of health to include a more holistic view which included mental, social, and spiritual aspects. Toward the end of his life and after his death, various organizations were created to teach his methods. In 1891, he founded Kneipp Bund, an organization that promotes water healing to this day. In America, Kneipp Societies were founded, which, under the influence of Benedict Lust, changed their name to Naturopatic Society of America. Today there are 600 organizations that are a part of Kneipp Worldwide and there are approximately 1000 members of the International Society of Kneipp Physicians. After his death, his treatments became part of mainstream medicine in Germany.

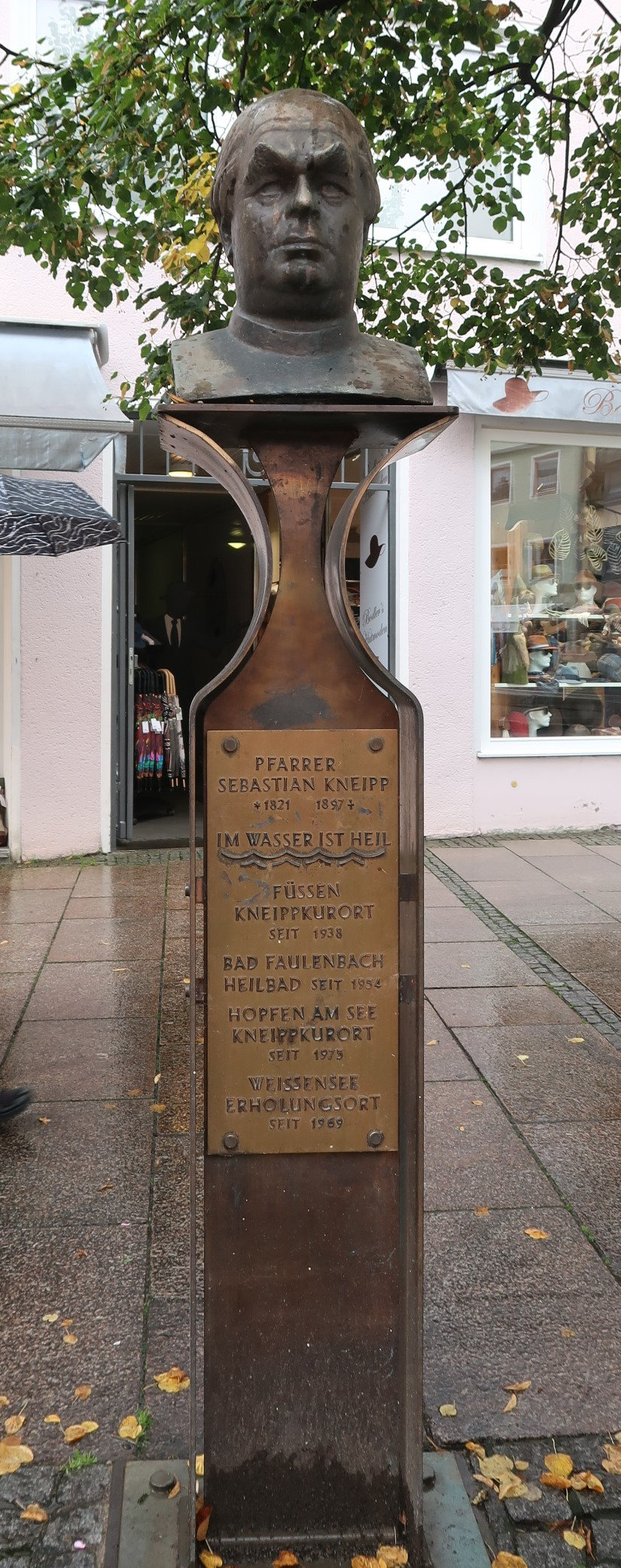
Kneipp Bust in Füssen

Archduke Joseph Karl of Austria dedicated his medical atlas to Kneipp. Kneipp's likeness was featured on a stamp. His recipe for whole wheat bread, called Kneippbrød, is the most commonly eaten bread in Norway. Many towns in Germany have statues to honour Kneipp, including Füssen.

== See also ==
- List of Roman Catholic scientist-clerics
- Kneipp facility
