= School meal =

Meal provided to students at school

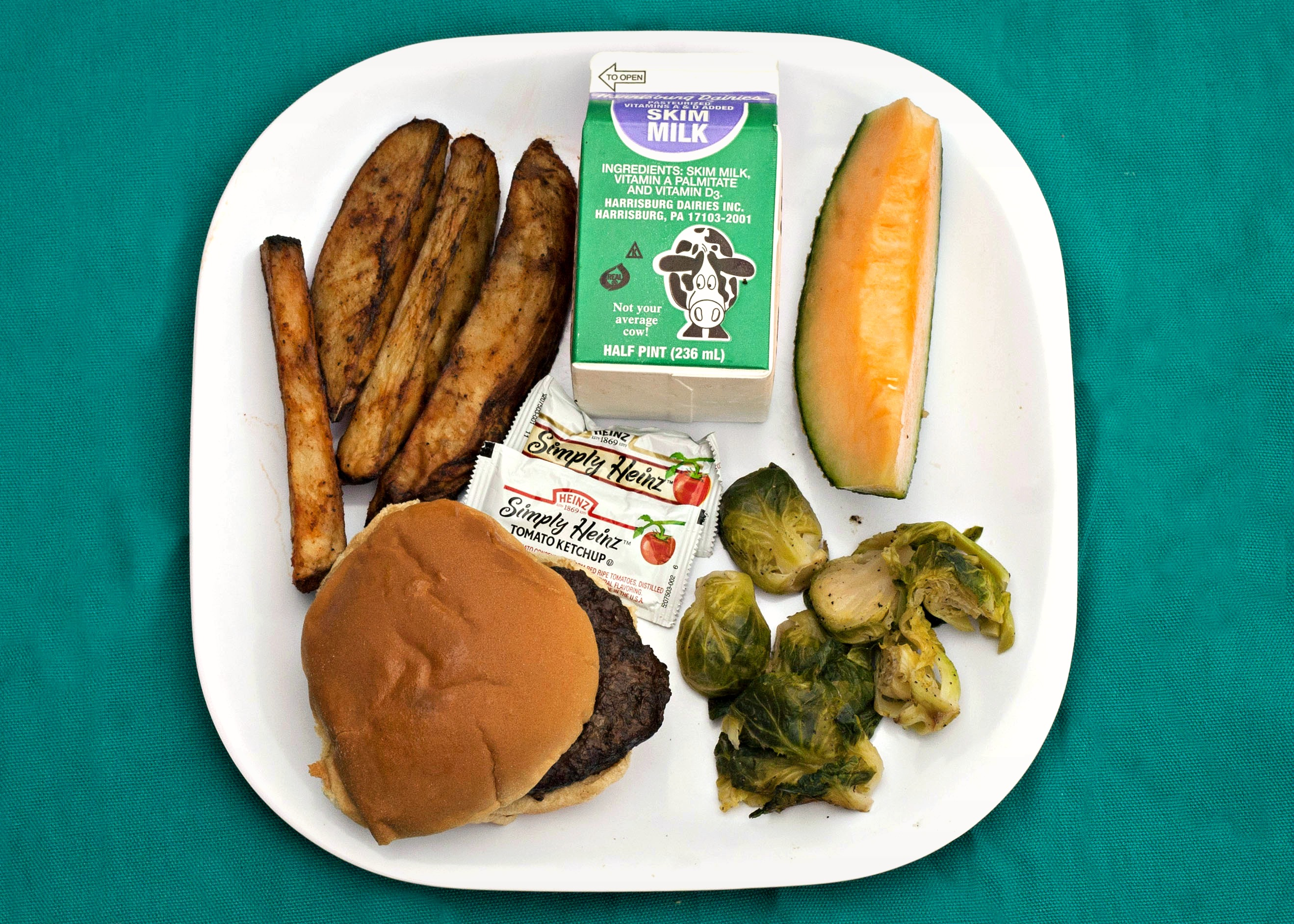
A school lunch in Washington, D.C., containing (clockwise from bottom left): hamburger, potato wedges, milk, cantaloupe, and roasted brussels sprouts

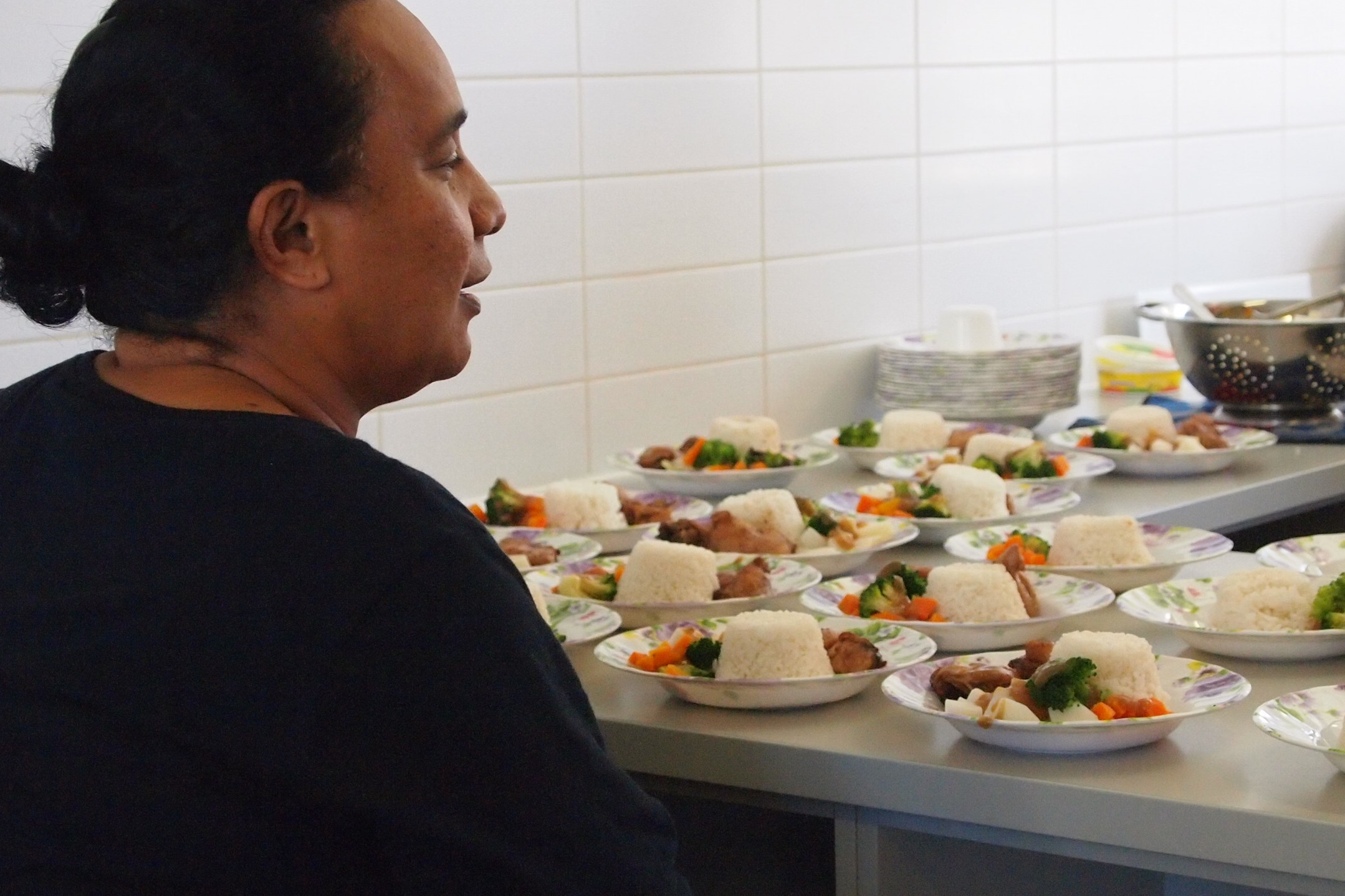
The principal of a Nauru secondary school inspecting school lunches (2012)

A school meal (whether it is a breakfast, lunch, or evening meal) is a meal provided to students and sometimes teachers at a school, typically in the middle or beginning of the school day. Countries around the world offer various kinds of school meal programs, and altogether, these are among the world's largest social safety nets. An estimated 380 million school children around the world receive meals (or snacks or take-home rations) at their respective schools. The extent of school feeding coverage varies from country to country, and as of 2020, the aggregate coverage rate worldwide is estimated to be 27% (and 40% specifically for primary school-age children).

The objectives and benefits of school meals vary. In developing countries, school meals provide food security at times of crisis and help children to become healthy and productive adults, thus helping to break the cycle of poverty and hunger. They can address micronutrient deficiencies by serving diverse foods or including fortified foods. They also serve as an incentive to send children to school and continue their education, and they can be leveraged specifically to reduce barriers to schooling for girls. When school meals are targeted toward low-income or vulnerable children, they serve as a social safety net. Especially in developed countries, school meals are structured to encourage healthy eating habits. School meal programs can also be aimed at supporting the domestic or local agricultural sector.

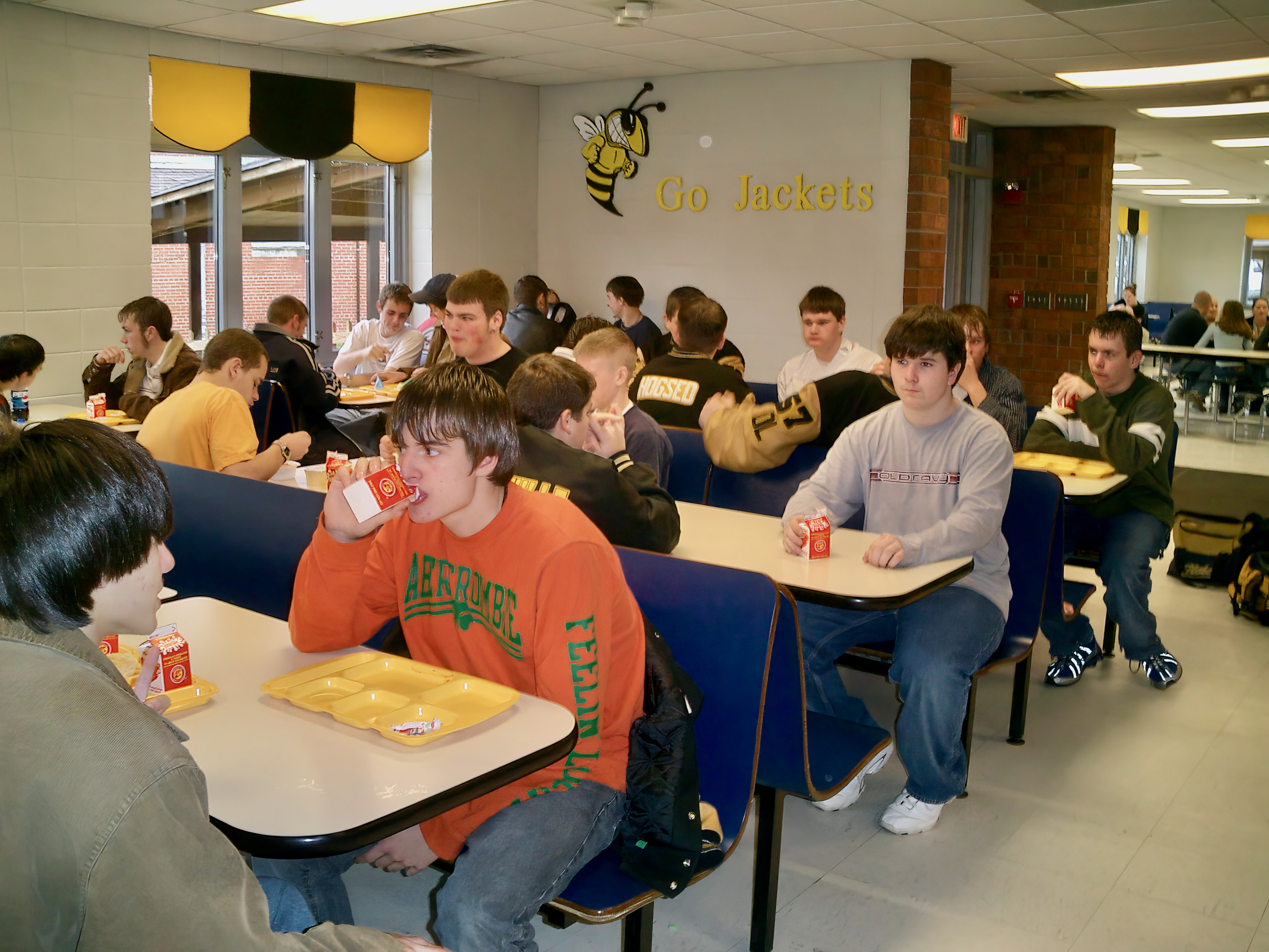
High school students eat lunch at a public school cafeteria in North Carolina (2004)

== History ==
The first school lunches were thought to be served in 1790 in Munich, Germany, by an American-born physicist, Benjamin Thompson, also known as Count Rumford. Thompson had spent his early days in New England, but as a royalist during the American Revolutionary War, he had become distrusted and left for England in 1784. In Munich, Thompson founded the Poor People's Institute which employed both adults and children to make uniforms for the German Army. They were fed and clothed for their work and the children were taught reading, writing and arithmetic. Years later, Thompson would feed 60,000 people a day from his soup kitchen in London.

In the United Kingdom, significant changes have been made since school meals were introduced in the 19th century by Elizabeth Burgwin and others. The first National School Meals Policy was published across the United Kingdom in 1941. The Policy set the first nutritional guidelines for school lunches, requiring balanced meals which include the appropriate levels of protein, fat, and calories.

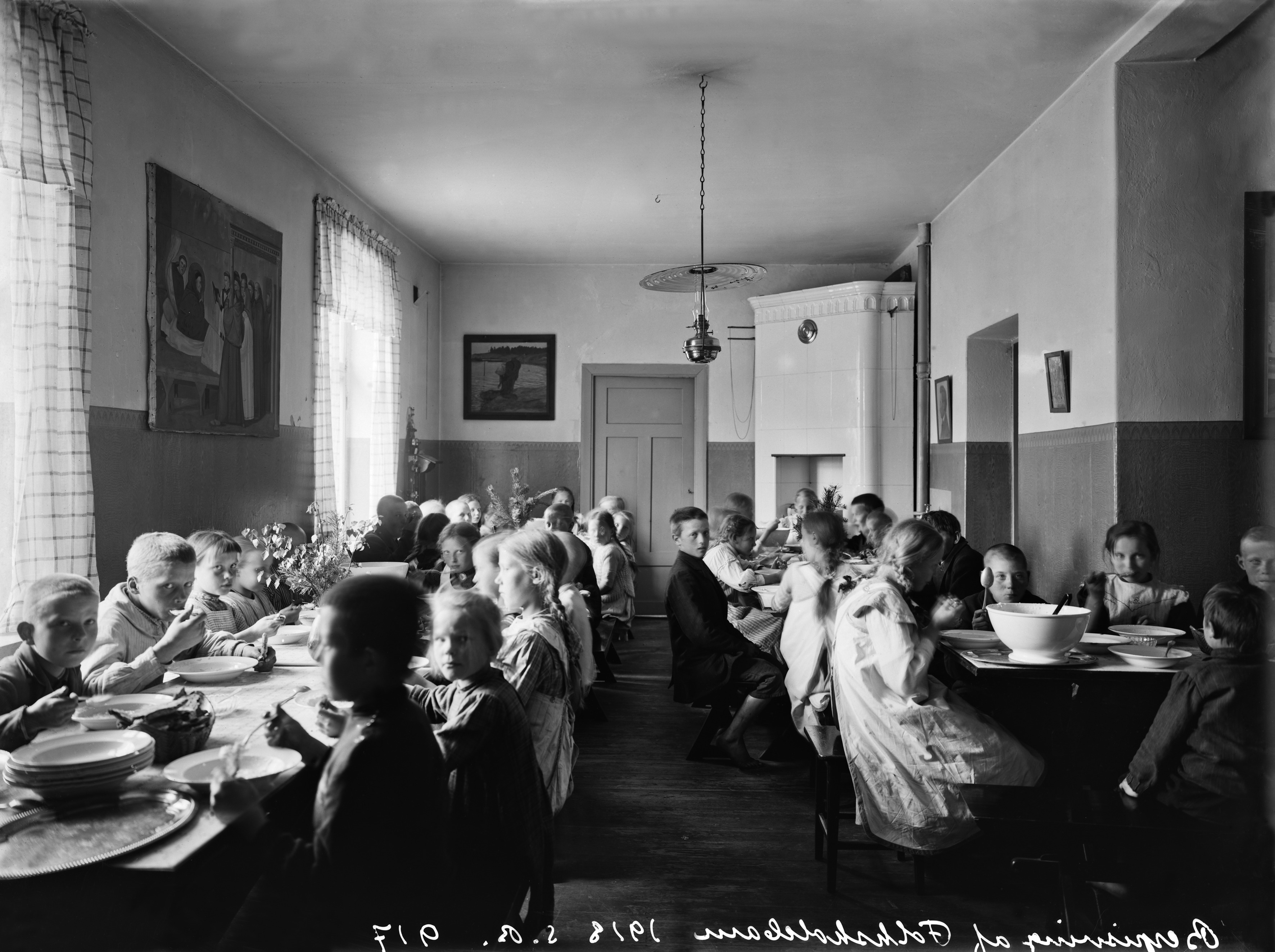
Pupils eating school meals at the Vallila Folk School in Vallila, Helsinki, Finland (1913)

In the United States, there was a social inequality gap during the industrial era, and there was room for improvement in all realms of education. Philadelphia and Boston were the first two cities to institute school lunches in the U.S. Organizations such as Women's Education and the Starr Center Association began serving hot meals to students for a cost that was affordable for most. Soon after, teachers started to notice the benefits for students – both mentally and physically. The federal government was not involved until the Great Depression (1920s), when farmers and labors were not doing well financially and the school lunch program was a solution that benefited everyone.

In recent years, school districts have faced government or community pressure to change the foods served in schools. The addition of vegan school meal options and Meatless Mondays are examples of these changes.

== Cost and subsidies ==
Free school meals can be universal school meals for all students or limited by income-based criteria, which can vary by country. A 2018 study of a free school meal program in the United States found that providing free meals to elementary and middle school children in areas characterized by high food insecurity led to better school discipline among the students. As of 2022 in England, 20.8% of the 8.9 million pupils attending schools in 2020–21 are known to be eligible for free school meals.

=== Universal school meals ===
Free school meals available for all students are also called Universal school meals. Sweden, Finland, Estonia, Brazil and India are among the few countries which provide universal school meals to all pupils in compulsory education, regardless of their ability to pay. In India, where all Government School students are provided with free lunches through the Midday Meal Scheme, staple foods are provided along with free education. Several states in the US offer universal school meals.

=== Targeted school meals ===
School meals can also be targeted, often toward students who are poor or otherwise vulnerable. Such targeting can be geographic (providing school meals in all schools with a region that is deemed food insecure or lower income), school-based (targeting schools with a population of generally poor students), or based on individual characteristics (targeting students based on their household income, ethnic status, or other individual traits). Across different settings and school meal programs, many different approaches are used when targeting school meals.

=== Reduced price meals ===
Reduced price meals are also available in some countries to those who need a degree of assistance with costs. Lower-cost meals are available to students in such countries as France, Italy, Hong Kong, Japan, Portugal, and the United States.

=== Full price meals ===
In some programs, meals are made available for purchase in school cafeterias/canteens at full price. For example, in the United States, students who do not qualify for reduced price lunches can still purchase food at the full price. In the United Arab Emirates, all food in school cafeterias is available for purchase, though prices reflect only the cost of the food itself.

== Preparation ==
School meals can be cooked in a kitchen (whether in each school or in a centralized kitchen, with the cooked food then delivered to individual schools).

School meals can also be uncooked, serving cold sandwiches or packaged biscuits. For example, the National School Nutrition Program in Egypt serves only Ma'amoul, a baked food item made with dates.

== Africa ==
=== Nigeria ===
In April 2012, the State of Osun in Nigeria started a statewide school meals programme for all public elementary school pupils. It is called the O'Meals programme (an acronym for the Osun Elementary School Feeding and Health Programme). As of July 2014, it was providing lunch to over 252,000 children in 100% of Osun's elementary schools. In addition to staples such as rice, beans, and yams served with stews, soups, and vegetables, the programme provides daily fruits. Its estimated cost is N50 (US$0.31) per child per day.

According to a report on O'Meals' benefits:

Within four weeks of the O'Meals launch, school enrollment increase[d] by approximately 25%. According to the Nigerian National Bureau of Statistics July 2013 edition, Osun has the highest primary school enrollment rates in Nigeria – a feat largely attributable to O'Meals. [Additionally,] O'Meals promotes and boosts income generation opportunities, particularly for women. To date, the program has economically empowered over 3,000 previously unemployed women by hiring them as food vendors[.]

All food items are sourced locally from farmers and others on the supply chain, enhancing employment within the state. Addressing child malnutrition has raised students' academic performance, and has increased school enrollment by 24% compared to figures from before April 2012.

In 2015, the manifesto of the All Progressives Congress (APC) advocated for the adoption of a nationwide free meal plan. Since he became president, Muhammadu Buhari has made the implementation of this policy one of his foremost priorities. A national School Meals programme is the subject of a budgetary proposal before the National Assembly. Also, the government of Kaduna State has implemented a school feeding programme.

== Americas ==
=== Canada ===
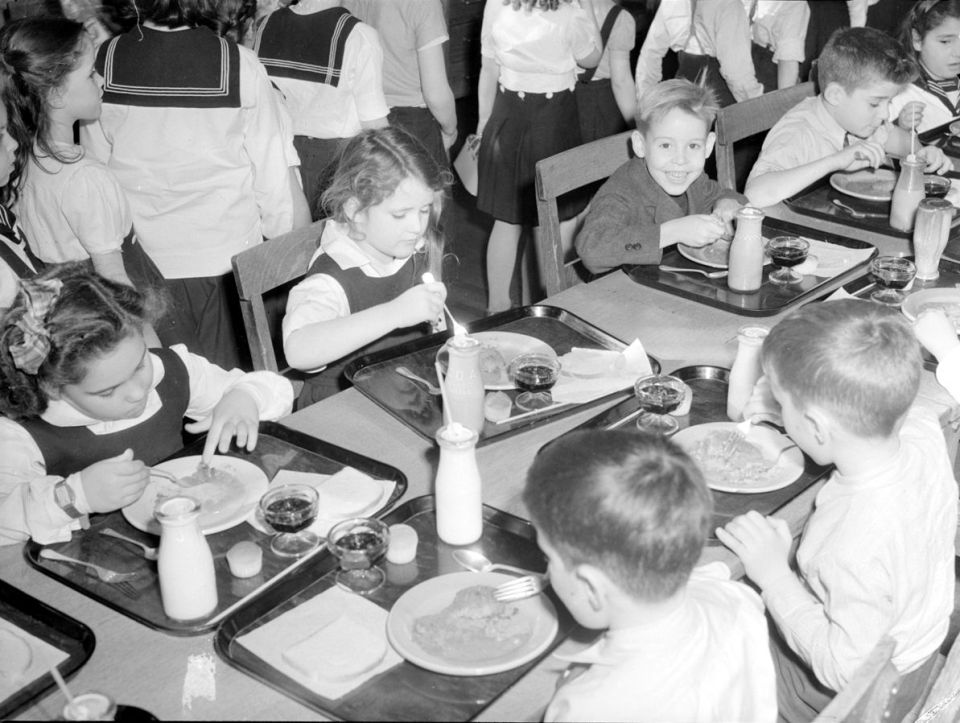
Children eating their lunch in a Montreal school, 1943

There are several non-profit organizations dedicated to student nutrition. In 2024, prime minister Justin Trudeau announced a national school food program.

A 2021 study of school meal programs across Canada estimated that these programs are found in about 35% of JK–12 schools, with a minimum of 1,018,323 or 21% of students in the country receiving free breakfasts, lunches, and/or snacks. There is considerable diversity in the design of these programs across Canada's provinces and territories. Though non-profit entities implement these programs, governments contributed over Can$93 million in 2018/19.

=== United States ===
Universal school meal programs in the United States Permanent universal school meal program Former temporary universal school meal program No universal school meal program

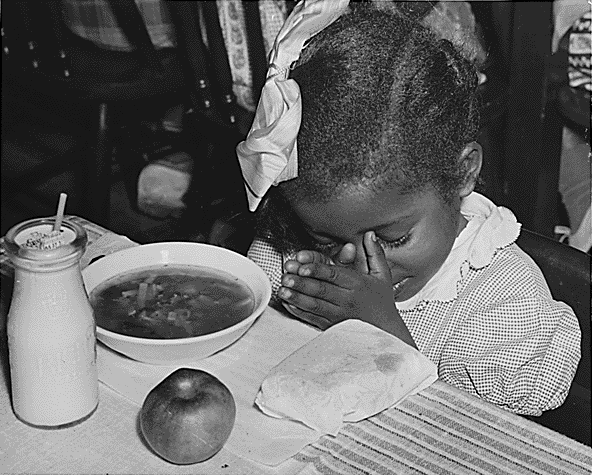
Recipient of the U.S. School Lunch Program in 1936

==== History ====
School lunches at the national level began as a temporary New Deal project in 1933. By 1935 it was run by the WPA in 1935–1942, as a way to employ the unemployed, feed hungry children, and reduce crop surpluses. It was ended in World War II when the WPA closed. In 1937 the WPA reported, "In the past year and a half 80,000,000 hot well-balanced meals have been served at the rate of 500,000 daily in 10,000 schools throughout the country."

The permanent National School Lunch Program was created in 1946, with the National School Lunch Act. This legislation won rural support because it removed surplus food from the market and thus raised prices paid to farmers. Congress intended these meals to promote and protect child nutrition, while also supporting the consumption of American farm products.

==== Current status ====
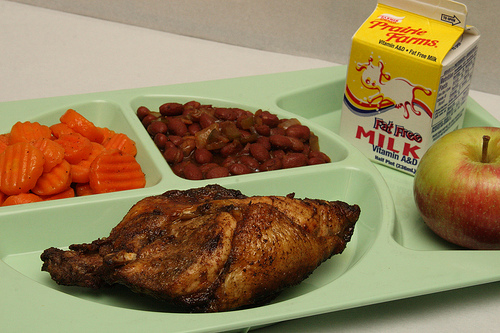
Chicken, sweet and spicy baked beans, and glazed carrots were part of the new recipe served to students in Chicago schools, 2011.

Today, the National School Lunch Program is a federal nutrition assistance program operating in over 101,000 public schools, non-profit private schools, and residential care institutions. It is regulated and administered at the federal level by the Food and Nutrition Service of the United States Department of Agriculture (USDA). The program provides "nutritionally balanced meals" at low or no cost to more than 31 million children each school day.

Since its inception, the Program has expanded substantially. It now includes the School Breakfast Program, the Snack Program, a Child and Adult Care Food Program, and the Summer Food Service Program. At the State level, the National School Lunch Program is usually administered by state education agencies, which operate the program through agreements with school food authorities.

School meal programs in the United States provide meals free of charge, or at a reduced (government-subsidized) price, to the children of low-income families. Those who do not qualify for free or reduced price are charged a nominal fee.

==== Contents and nutritional guidelines ====
School lunches must meet over the course of one week the applicable recommendations of the Dietary Guidelines for Americans, which were criticized for high sugar limits. These guidelines state that no more than 30 percent of an individual's calories should come from fat, and less than 10 percent from saturated fat. Regulations also state that school lunches must provide one-third of the Recommended Dietary Allowances of protein, vitamin A, vitamin C, iron, calcium, and calories.

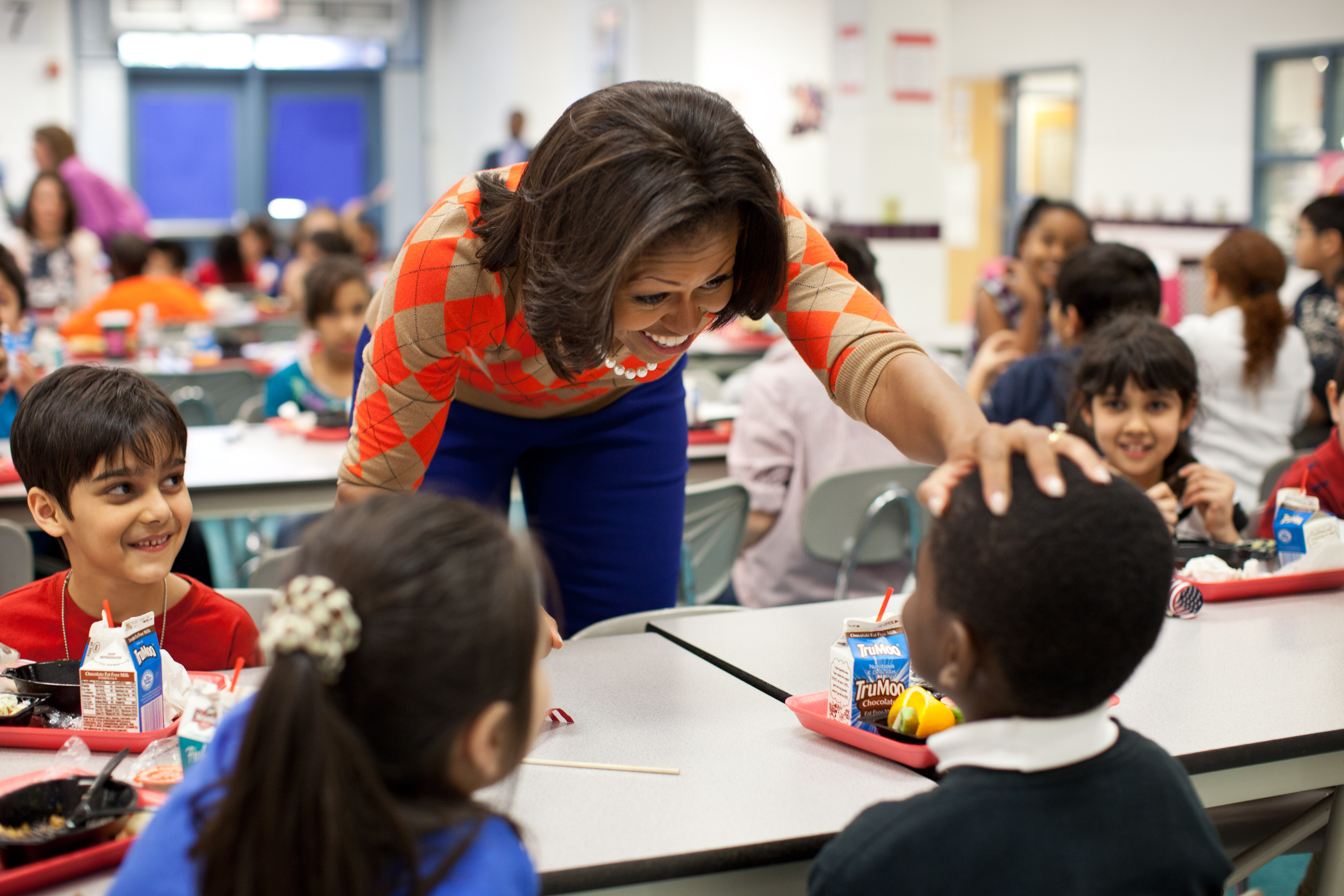
Former First Lady Michelle Obama with students in Virginia sampling healthy meals being introduced by the United States Department of Agriculture

Since the Healthy, Hunger-Free Kids Act of 2010 Michelle Obama has advocated for the importance of healthy school lunches. Schools were having difficulty enforcing nutrition values in fear of being wasteful because children are no longer eating their lunches. The amount of fruits and vegetables, whole grains and sodium levels were a political compromise. To avoid further conflict between the senate and the administration, the USDA has tolerated exemptions pertaining to the whole grain standard and allowed schools to do what they find necessary to finding a more fitting solution.

Vending machines in schools are also a major source of food for students. Under pressure from parents and anti-obesity advocates, many school districts moved to ban sodas, junk foods, and candy from vending machines and cafeterias. Various laws have also been passed to limit foods sold in school vending machines. With increasing concern over traditional vending machines in schools, healthier vending options have gained popularity and are steadily being adopted by schools around the nation. Marketing for such "healthy vending machines" states that they allow students to perform better in school while also attaining better health.

== Asia ==
=== China ===
A typical school lunch in the People's Republic of China includes staple food, meat diet, vegetable dish, and each school has different kind of dishes. Students can choose between two and three dishes according to their preferences, with a staple food, usually rice.

In impoverished rural areas, students' access to nutritious food is limited. The government has funded "nutritious lunch" schemes in rural public schools to combat malnutrition. Government data from June 2017 indicated that 48% of schools were unable to fully meet recommended nutrition standards.

=== India ===
School meals are provided for free at public schools in India.

==== History ====
The roots of India's school meal program can be traced back to the pre-independence era, when a mid day meal programme was introduced in 1925 in Madras Corporation by the British administration. This was one of the oldest free food programmes for schoolchildren. In 1975, the Indian government created the Integrated Child Development Services (ICDS) programme. Under the Midday Meal Scheme, government high schools and partially aided schools, along with Anganwadis, provide midday meals to students. As of 2022, the total cost of providing free meals to students in India is ₹22,000 crore (US$2.4 billion) of which 60% is paid by the federal government and 40% is paid by the states.

By 1998, India had deployed the National Programme of Nutritional Support to Primary Education (NP-NSPE) scheme. During the 2013–2014 school year, the scheme covered 104 million children in 1.16 million schools.

==== Contents ====
A single afternoon lunch usually contains a cereal which is locally available, made in a way that conforms to prevailing local customs. Each child receives milk, and either soup or vegetables cooked as curry. Under the scheme of the Indian government, each primary level student must be provided with 100 grams of food grains each day, along with 20 grams of protein, 50 grams of leafy vegetables and 5 grams of oil and fat. For upper-primary and senior students, they must be provided with 150 grams of food grains, 30 grams of protein, 75 grams of leafy vegetables and 7.5 grams of oil and fat. In accordance with nutritional guidelines, primary level students are given 450 grams of calories and 12 grams of proteins each day and senior and upper-primary level students are given 700 grams of calories and 20 grams of proteins each day. The rice and other graines served during the midday meal is fortified with nutrients such as iron, vitamin B_{12} and folate.

Children in private schools usually carry their own lunch boxes. Many schools also have canteens, and street food vendors can often be found in front of school campuses.

=== Iran ===
In the 1960s, Shah Mohammad Reza Pahlavi had intended a non-violent regeneration of Iranian society through economic and social reforms called the White Revolution. The reforms' long-term goal was to transform Iran into a global economic and industrial power. The White Revolution consisted of 19 elements that were introduced over a period of 15 years. In 1975, the Shah started a program for 'Free and Compulsory Education and a daily free meal' for all children from kindergarten to 14 years of age. It provided one-third of a pint of free milk to all children in Iran, as well as pistachios, fresh fruit, and biscuits.

=== Japan ===
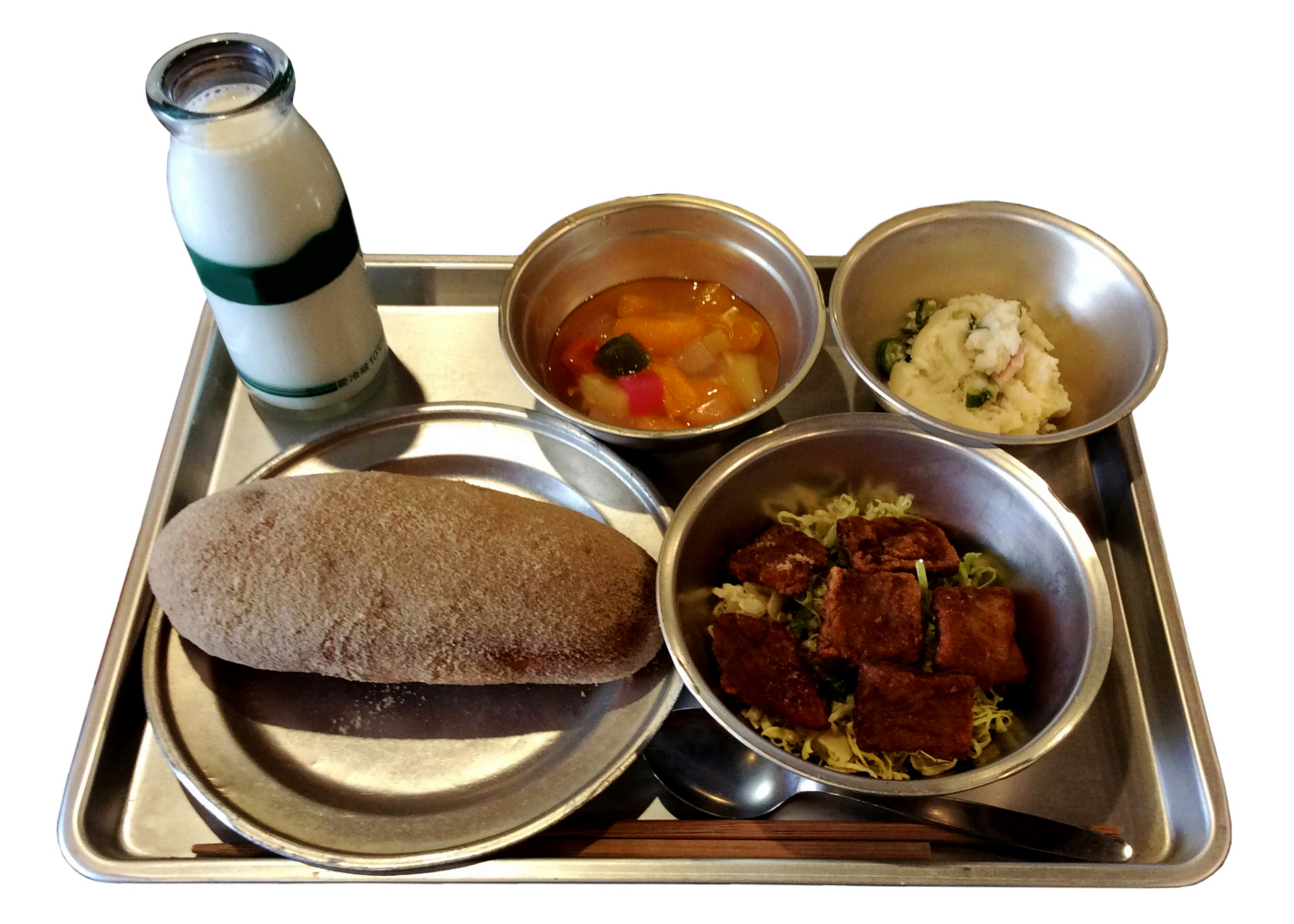
Reproduced Japanese school lunch 1970s

==== History ====
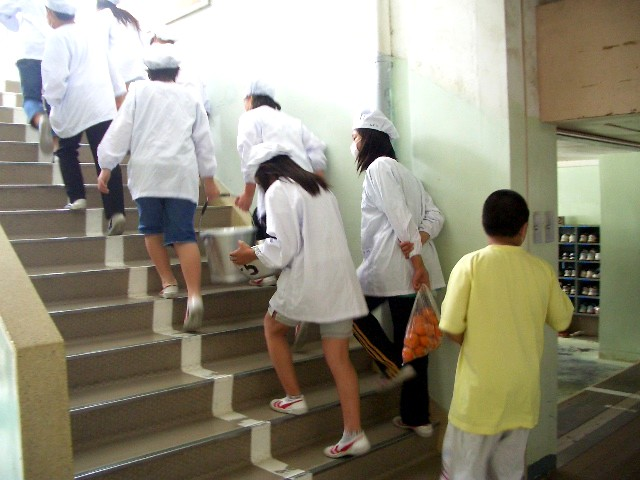
In Japan, students set and clean the tables.

In Japan, the tradition of providing school lunches started in the early 20th century. After World War II, which brought near-famine conditions to the country, the Japanese government re-introduced school lunches in urban areas. School lunch was extended to all elementary schools in Japan in 1952. With the enactment of the School Lunch Law in 1954, school meals were extended to junior high schools as well.

These early lunches initially included items such as bread, bread rolls, and skimmed milk powder (replaced in 1958 by milk bottles and cartons). Later, lunches were expanded to include flour donated by an American charity; a dessert; and a dish (such as daikon) that changed daily. Other dishes included inexpensive protein such as stewed bean dishes, fried white fish, and, until the 1970s, whale meat. Provisions of rice were introduced in 1976, following a surplus of government-distributed Japanese rice, and became increasingly frequent during the 1980s. Hamburg steak, stew and Japanese curry became staples as well.

==== Current status ====
As of 2004, 99% of elementary school students and 82% of junior high school students in Japan ate kyūshoku (school lunch). The food is grown locally, is almost never frozen, and (barring dietary restrictions) is the same for every student. Children in most districts cannot bring their own meals to school until they reach high school, nor do schools have vending machines; instead, children are taught to eat what they are served.

In both elementary school and middle school, students put on white coats and caps and serve their classmates, who then all eat together in their classrooms instead of in a cafeteria.

To make lunches affordable for students, municipalities pay for the labor costs, while parents, who are billed monthly, pay for the ingredients. These typically cost about 250 to 300 yen (about US$3) per meal per student. There are reduced-price and free options for poorer families.

==== Contents and nutritional guidelines ====
The daily lunches are designed by nutritionists to provide a balanced yet tasty meal for schoolchildren, working especially to appeal to picky or unhealthy eaters. According to Chico Harlan:

Though Japan's central government sets basic nutritional guidelines, regulation is surprisingly minimal. Not every meal has to meet precise caloric guidelines......Central government officials say they have ultimate authority to step in if schools are serving unhealthy food, but they can't think of any examples where that actually happened. ... And because this is food-obsessed Japan, those standard meals are restaurant-worthy; in fact, Adachi Ward publishes a full-color cookbook based on its best school meals. [However,] Japanese cuisine isn't automatically healthy; it includes crispy chicken, rich bowls of salty ramen with pork belly and battered and deep-fried tempura. But, like most cuisines, it can be healthy. ... You don't see dessert, other than fruit and yogurt. You occasionally see fried food, but in stark moderation.

=== Malaysia ===
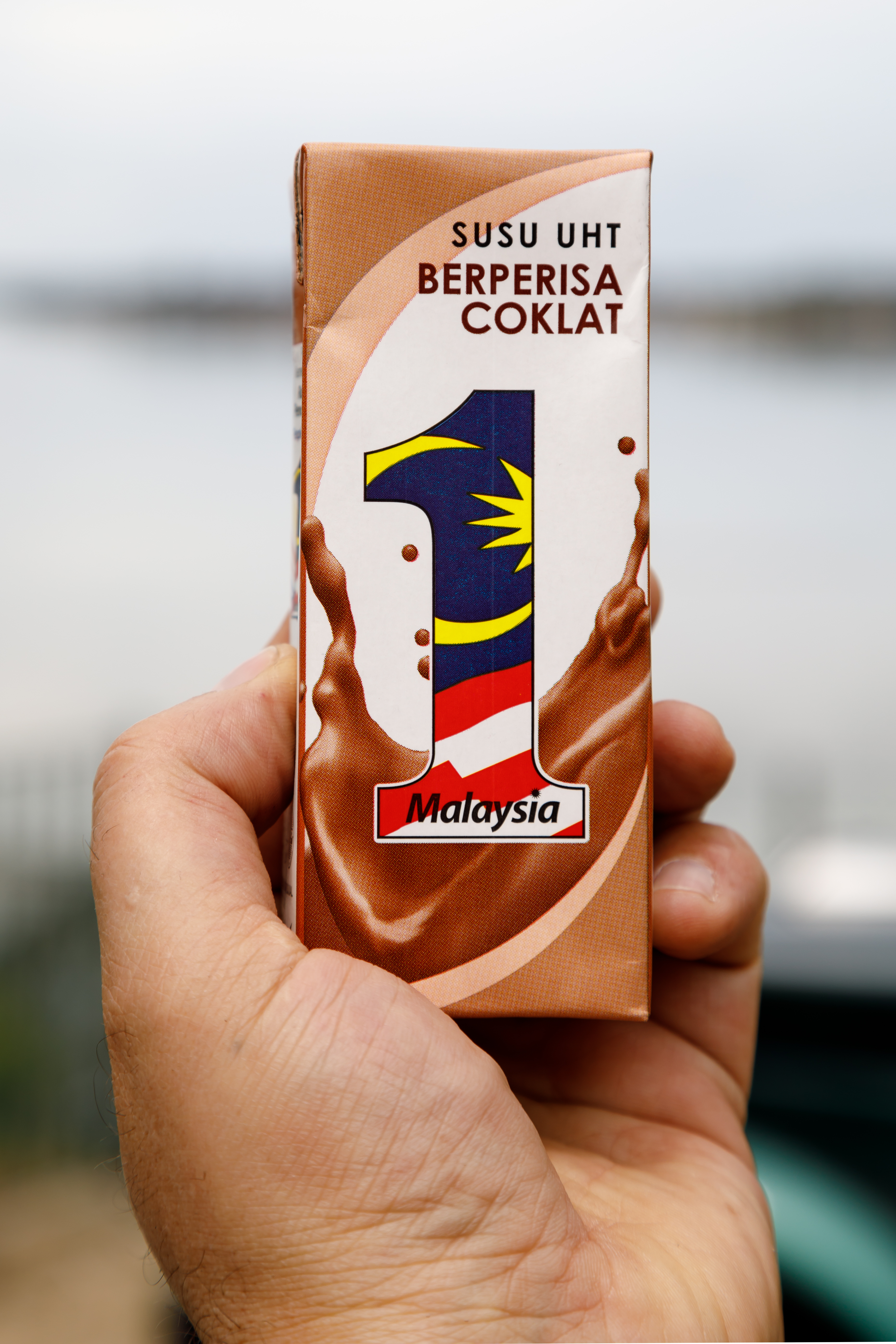
"One Malaysia" School Milk, provided as part of a Government Program to enhance health of school children

In most Malaysian schools, regardless of whether they are public or private schools, students eat in a canteen where they purchase food and drinks from vendors. School canteens usually offer Malay, Chinese, and Indian foods, with varieties of rice, noodles, and breads. The average Malaysian school canteen offers varieties of Nasi Lemak, Nasi Goreng, Chicken Rice, Popiah, and Laksa.

School canteens sell food and drinks at reduced prices. Underprivileged students can apply for the free-food program – which, depending on the school, is either sponsored by the school's parent–teacher association or by the Ministry of Education. Low-income students may also be eligible for the School Milk Program, which is funded by milk companies and non-governmental organizations.

=== Philippines ===
Republic Act 11037, signed in 2018, is the Philippine government's national feeding program to address malnutrition among Filipino students. The Department of Education (DepEd) heads the school-based feeding program for public school children from kindergarten to Grade 6. The program covers the whole school year, offering hot meals free of charge, based on a menu cycle that is approved by the DepEd central office. The Gulayan sa Paaralan (Vegetable garden in Schools) program, also spearheaded by DepEd, assists schools in cultivating vegetables and other nutrient-rich plants to supplement feeding initiatives. Moreover, a milk-feeding program, a micronutrient feeding program, vaccinations, and health examinations are among those provided by the government.

=== Singapore ===
School meals in most Singaporean primary and secondary schools, as well as junior colleges, are provided in each school's canteen (or tuckshop). The canteens consist of stalls which sell a variety of foods as well as beverages. To cater to the many races, religions, and cultures in Singapore, canteens often offer a range of cuisines, like Chinese, Indian, Malay, and Western foods.

To encourage healthier eating habits among children, the Health Promotion Board of Singapore launched the Healthy Eating in Schools Programme, which gives an award to schools which serve healthy meals. To receive the award, schools must reduce the sugar content in drinks and desserts, serve fewer deep-fried and fatty foods, and include two servings of greens in their meals.

In response to recent decreases of food stallholders, the Singapore Ministry of Education piloted the Central Kitchen Meal Model (CKMM) with the Yusof Ishak Secondary School in 2022 and began rollouts in 2025. Under the CKMM, vendors are required to provide at least one nutritious meal priced no more than $2.70 for primary schools and $3.60 for elementary schools. 13 schools were selected for the CKMM for the 2026 school year. Students order a bento-style meal in advance and pick it up from the school canteens.

A Channel News Asia investigation revealed that various primary school children complained about the presentation and taste of CKMM-prepared meals. Students were also seen throwing away parts of the meals.

=== South Korea ===
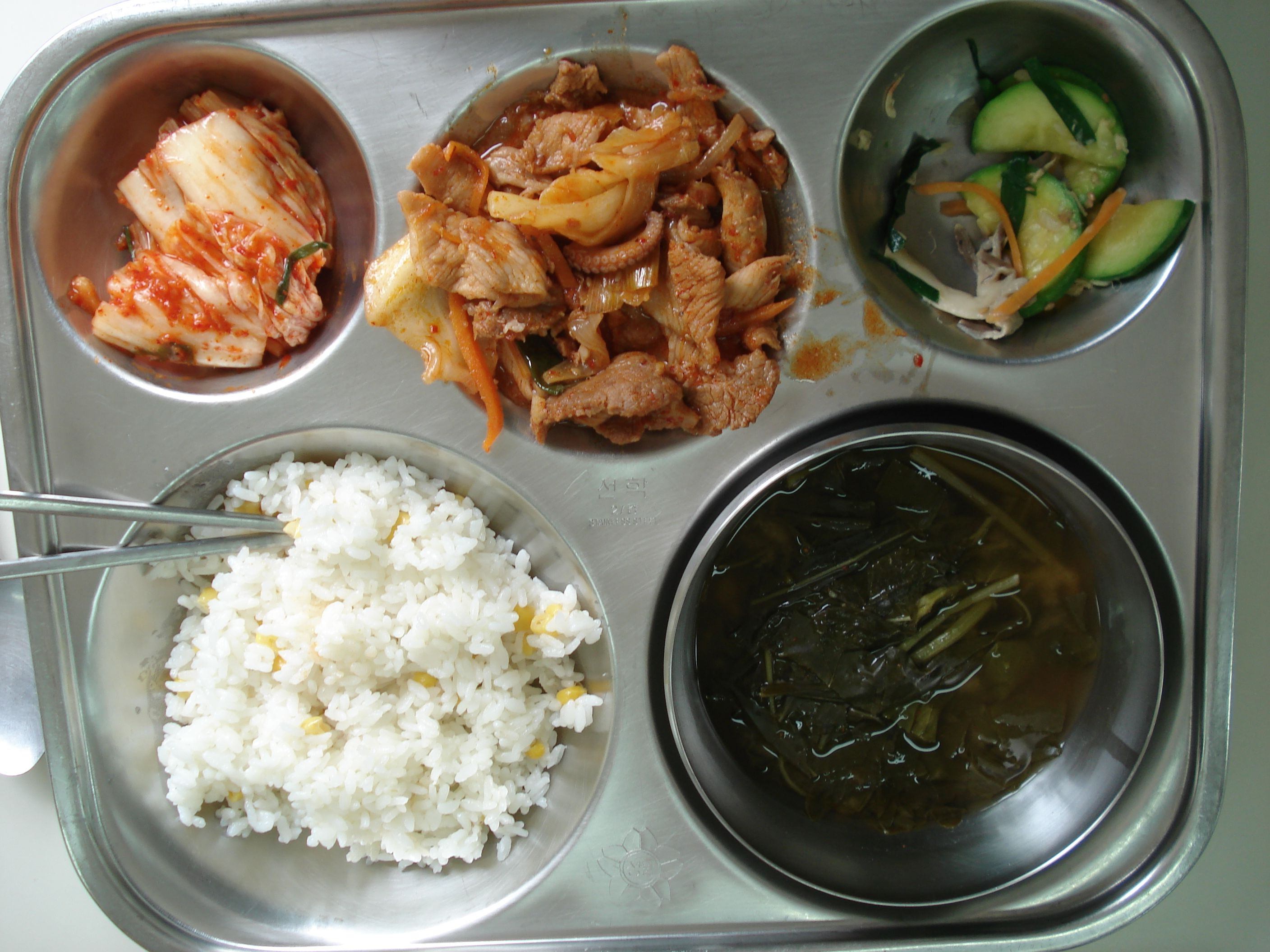
A South Korean school lunch

South Korea has provided free school lunches to low-income students since the 1980s at the primary and secondary school levels.

==== History ====
Elementary schools began to provide meals in the late 1990s, and until the mid-2000s, the program was expanded to middle and high schools. It is funded by local governments and local offices of education, and currently, all elementary schools and most middle and high schools nationwide provide free lunch.

==== Contents ====
Generally, South Korean school meals consist of meat, fish, or vegetable banchan, as well as soup and kimchi. These foods, like other Korean dishes, are processed to a minimum and are usually low-fat and high-protein. In addition, the country's government strictly controls the sugar and fat limits of school meals by running several campaigns and educational programs during school mealtimes.

==== Culture ====
Many schools have "Clean Plate Wednesday," which encourages students to eat leftovers to reduce food waste. Delicious foods such as Samgyupsal and bibimbap are usually on the menu for the day so that this is more possible.

== Europe ==
=== Estonia ===
In Estonia, free school dinners are served in elementary and secondary schools.

==== Nutritional guidelines ====
Nutritional guidelines for Estonian school meals are based on the Estonian food pyramid. At the pyramid's base are water and exercise. The next tier up includes starches, fruits, and vegetables. According to Estonia's Food-Based Dietary Guidelines, these foods should comprise the majority of each meal. The middle section of the pyramid includes dairy products and meat. The Guidelines suggest eating these foods in small portions on a daily basis. Just below the top tier are oils, butter and nuts. At the peak of the pyramid are foods like ice cream, soft drinks, honey, and biscuits: high-sugar foods which should be eaten sparingly, as special treats.

=== Finland ===
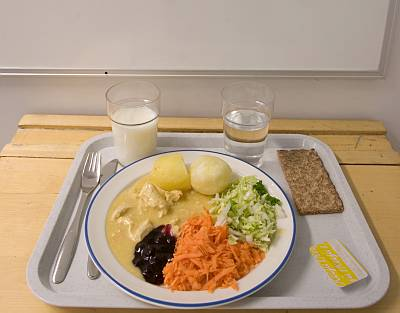
A typical Finnish school lunch served free of charge to all pupils

==== History ====
Finland provides free, catered hot school meals to all pupils from pre-primary to upper secondary education every school day, as guaranteed by the 1948 Basic Education Act. Section 31 of the Basic Education Act states: "A pupil attending basic education shall be provided with a balanced and appropriately organized and supervised meal on every school day."

Some Finnish cities had offered poor students free school dinners since the beginning of the 20th century. For example, Kuopio did so starting in 1902, and extended school dinners to all students in 1945.

==== Current status ====
According to Finnish National Board of Education statistics from the year 2014, the average school meal was valued at 2.80 euros per student-school day, totaling 532 euros per student for the school year. This sum included ingredients, labor costs, kitchen equipment, and other fixed expenses, but neither property costs nor taxes.

Children taking part in before- and after-school activities are also served a free healthy snack.

==== Higher education ====
Lunches for higher education students (like those attending universities and polytechnics) are also subsidized in Finland. Kela, the Social Insurance Institution of Finland, compensates student meals that fulfill the nutritional and pricing criteria for government meal subsidies. This program's purpose is to promote positive health and nutritional trends among students. The program accommodates special dietary needs – whether in connection with religion, ethical beliefs, or health issues – without extra costs.

==== Objectives and role in learning ====
Free school meals in Finland are viewed as an investment for the future; the aim is to maintain and improve children's health, well-being, and learning. The school meal is used as a pedagogical tool for teaching table manners, food culture, nutrition, and healthy eating habits, as well as for increasing the consumption of vegetables, fruits and berries, wholemeal bread, and skimmed or low-fat milk. One of the basic lessons is cooperation between students, head teachers, teachers, parents, and catering staff. In many schools, students participate in the work of the school canteen during their working life practice period. Most schools have a school meal committee where students, teachers, and catering staff develop school catering together. Most schools also welcome parents to come and taste school meals. There are always adults present in the school restaurant. The pedagogical role of the school catering staff is seen as important, as is teachers' knowledge of nutrition. In 2009, Finland began developing school meal and nutrition education for teachers, and pedagogical education for school catering personnel.

National and local regulations form the basis for Finnish school meal practices. Education acts and decrees and local curricula are central documents governing school meals. Local and school-level curricula define the central principles of arranging school catering. The curricula also describe the objectives for education in health, nutrition, and manners. The health-related and social role of school meals, the objectives of teaching nutrition and manners, and the recreational aspect of lunch breaks are taken into account when arranging school meals and snacks. Students are allowed at least 30 minutes for eating, after which they have a short recess outdoors.

School lunches can also be a channel for empowering local food producers. Introducing locally produced fish to the offerings of institutional kitchens, such as school canteens, is an ethical and ecological alternative to mass-produced meat or imported fish.

==== Contents and nutritional guidelines ====
School meals generally consist of typical Finnish foods. A basic school meal consists of a warm main course, vegetables, bread, a table spread, and a drink. The school lunch is calculated to equate to about one-third of a child's daily nutritional needs. School catering is designed to follow the National Nutrition Council's dietary guidelines for schools. The recommendations for school meals are being updated during the year 2016.

Normally, Finnish schools provide lunch at school canteens in the form of a buffet, where pupils serve themselves as much as they want. Schools often use a model plate to guide eating habits towards the following recommendations: (Note: See, for example, this list of sample school menus from the city of Helsinki.)

- Fresh and cooked vegetables covering half of the plate
- Potatoes, rice, or pasta covering one quarter of the plate
- Fish at least once a week (preferably twice a week); meat; or beans and sprouts as part of a vegetarian diet covering the remaining quarter of the plate
- Skimmed or semi-skimmed milk, or fermented milk products
- Water
- Bread with vegetable margarine or a butter-margarine blend
- Berries or fruit for dessert

Children with special dietary needs – whether in connection with religion, ethical beliefs or health issues – are entitled to a special diet without costs. School menus are designed to be suitable for most students, with minor adjustments if needed. If a child has special dietary needs, their school requires specific information about those needs to ensure food safety and the elimination of possible cross contamination. In the case of health-related special diets, schools require the assessment of a doctor, nurse, or dietitian.

As with school lunches, before- and after-school snacks are used as a pedagogical tool in teaching children about proper nutrition, table manners, and food culture. Snacks are designed to offer variety and take into consideration Finnish Nutrition Recommendations as well as children's individual needs.

==== The School Lunch Diploma ====
Finland has no national accreditation system to evaluate the quality of school lunches. However, by the end of 2015, over 200 schools had been awarded the School Lunch Diploma. The diploma certifies a school's commitment to the national standards and recommendations for nutritionally, educationally, and ecologically sustainable school lunches. It is also an indication of excellent collaboration among interest groups within the school. The School Lunch Diploma is coordinated by the Finnish Kitchen Professionals Association.

=== France ===
==== History ====
In the 1970s, the French government began to work on improving school lunches. In 1971, the government established nutritional guidelines for French school meals. The 1971 food recommendation guidelines stated that each meal should contain raw vegetables, such as salads and fruits; protein in the form of milk or other dairy products; cooked vegetables twice per week; and carbohydrates on the remaining days.

==== Current status ====
In France, lunch is considered the most important meal of the day. Students can get lunch at school or go home for it. The lunch break is one to two hours long. French students are taught to take time to savor and enjoy their meals. Students have to pay for cafeteria lunches; the cost of the meal varies by region. A student's family pays for half of the meal, while the school pays for the remainder. For example, a typical meal may cost $6, with the family paying $3 instead of the full price.

A well-known school catering subscription company in France is called "Turboself".

==== Contents and nutritional guidelines ====
The 2001 food recommendation guidelines, signed by the Minister for National Education, state that school lunches must be healthy and balanced. Menus vary daily, and are posted for parents. Specifically, the guidelines state that:

- There should be very little fat in school foods
- School meals must contain vitamins and minerals
- The main course of each school meal must contain meat, fish, or eggs

School cafeterias serve five-course meals, even for preschoolers. Schoolchildren eat the same things as adults. A school lunch in France contains an appetizer, salad, main course, cheese plate, and dessert. Bread may accompany each meal. A menu might include potato leek soup, carrot and bean salad, lamb with saffron, an assortment of cheeses, and grapefruit. Each meal is accompanied with water.

French schools do not have vending machines.

=== Italy ===
School meals in Italy provide regular Italian cuisine, although they may vary among regions and towns. The Italian government is very "down to people" and is doing a large-scale study to measure and involve students in food habits, diets, and food choices. However, many parents struggle for the right to pack home meals for their children since school food is rather expensive.

=== Netherlands ===
Under the Compulsory Education Act of 1901, the authority was given to municipalities to provide needy children with food and clothing.

=== Norway ===
Norwegian school lunches were supplied from Sweden during World War II, partly privately financed. Later, all public school lunches were discontinued, so most Norwegian students bring a packed lunch from home. In 2007, schools began providing one free piece of fruit each day for all pupils in grades 8–10. Norwegian schools also sell subsidized milk.

=== Sweden ===
School lunches have been free in Swedish elementary schools since 1973. The government or municipality covers all charges. Normally, school lunches are buffet-style. Buffets chiefly include potatoes, pasta or rice; meat or fish; and vegetables. Milk and water are usually offered as drinks. There are also vegetarian options, as well as foods that meet religious requirements; these foods are also free of charge. Upper secondary schools do not have to provide meals for their students, but many, both public and charter schools do.

Usually, each municipality signs a private contract with a catering company which provides school food. Many of the food products are imported, but still have a good standard. In many schools, teachers or the school principal eat with the pupils, with the goal of creating a stronger connection between students and school authorities. In Swedish schools there are also international food weeks, or vegetarian weeks.

A 2021 study, which used the gradual implementation of free, nutritious school lunches across Sweden, found that the school lunches led to improvements in health and educational outcomes, as well as improvements in adult income.

=== United Kingdom ===
==== History ====
School meal programs in the United Kingdom can be traced back to the Education (Provision of Meals) Act 1906.

In 1944, the United Kingdom required local authorities to provide school dinners that were consistent with legal nutritional requirements. The government paid the full cost of school meals in 1947. Free school meals were available to children with families on very low incomes. As a result, from the 1950s onward, staple traditional "school dinner" foods became embedded in the national psyche. "School puddings" in particular refers to desserts historically served with school dinners in both state and independent schools. Examples include tarts such as gypsy tart and Manchester tart, and hot puddings such as spotted dick and treacle sponge pudding. (Note: British celebrity chef Gordon Ramsay discusses school puddings as comfort food in The Times.)

In the 1980s, Margaret Thatcher's Conservative government ended entitlement to free meals for thousands of children, and obliged local authorities to open up provision of school meals to competitive tender. This was intended to reduce the cost of school meals provided by local authorities. However, it caused a substantial decrease in the standard of school food. A 1999 survey by the Medical Research Council suggested that despite rationing, children in 1950 had healthier diets than their counterparts in the 1990s, with more nutrients and less fat and sugar.

This became a major topic of debate in 2004, when chef Jamie Oliver spearheaded a campaign to improve the quality of school meals. At this time, school dinners at state schools were normally made by outside caterers. The schools sold a lot of deep-fried fast food, like chips, fried turkey nuggets, pizza, and pies. After the Jamie's School Dinners programme was shown on Channel 4, sections of the public showed support for increased school meal funding, causing the government to create the School Food Trust. This topic became a factor in the 2005 UK general election.

==== Current status ====
The principal legislation is The Requirements for School Food Regulations 2014. School governors are responsible for the provision of food in schools. They must ensure compliance with food standards, suitable accommodation for children to eat provided meals and food brought in from home in a calm and enjoyable way, as well as oversee the take-up of school meals and financial aspects of school food provision.

Since September 2014, all infant pupils (four to seven years age group) in English schools have been entitled to a free hot meal at lunchtime every day. This was an initiative of Deputy Prime Minister Nick Clegg, who launched the plan at the Liberal Democrats conference in 2013. At the initiative's inception, the government was paying £2.30 for each meal taken by newly eligible pupils.

Since January 2015, the Scottish government has provided free school meals for all children in Primary One to Three.

Similar schemes are in place for Wales and Northern Ireland.

The British government uses entitlement to free school meals as a measure of deprivation. For the financial year 2014–2015, the government paid schools a premium of £1,300 for primary-aged pupils, or £935 for secondary-aged pupils, for each eligible child. 11% of families entitled to free meals do not claim them, which means that their schools do not receive the extra funding. It was unclear in 2014 how this would be affected by the introduction of universal free meals for the youngest British schoolchildren.

In August 2019 it was revealed that local government planning for a No-deal Brexit encompassed the possibility of needing to change legal requirements underpinning the provision of school meals, for example by making them more expensive or less healthy; possibly even discarding the requirements entirely. One council also said that "special dietary requirements may be difficult to meet" and that fresh food might have to be replaced with frozen and tinned goods, while another mentioned the possibility of a return to rationing.

==== School meal standards ====
The school meal standards for England developed in 2014 include:

- High-quality meat, poultry or oily fish
- Bread, cereals or potatoes
- at least 1 portions of vegetables or salad as an accompaniment every day
- at least 3 different fruits, and 3 different vegetables each week
- an emphasis on wholegrain foods in place of refined carbohydrates
- an emphasis on making water the drink of choice, limiting fruit juice portions to 150 ml and restricting the amount of added sugars or honey in other drinks to 5%
- no more than 2 portions a week of food that has been deep fried, batter coated, or breadcrumb coated
- no more than 2 portions of food which includes pastry each week
- A ban on drinks with added sugars, crisps, chocolates or sweets in school meals or vending machines

In 2026 Secretary of State for Education Lucy Powell announced new standards to start in 2027. These would ban deep fried food, reduce the amounts of sweet food and processed meat, and increase fruit and vegetables.

==== Eligibility ====
As of November 2020, parents may apply for free school meals for children at school or in certain institutions up to the July after their 19th birthday.

- Income Support
- income-based Jobseeker's Allowance
- income-related Employment and Support Allowance
- Support under Part VI of the Immigration and Asylum Act 1999
- the guaranteed element of Pension Credit
- Child Tax Credit when not receiving Working Tax Credit with an annual gross income of less than £16,190
- Working Tax Credit run-on
- Universal Credit -with a household income of less than £7,400 a year (after tax and before benefits)

and if they are in years R, 1 and 2.

==== Disadvantaged Children and Pupil Premium ====
The receipt of Free School Meals (FSM) is one of the indicators of disadvantage. It entitles the school to a Pupil Premium, a sum of money, £1,350 as of January 2021, added to the annual budget. Disadvantaged pupils are a focus group for Ofsted and since 2015 the school's progress in closing the achievement gap between them and other pupils forms a major part in judging the school's outcomes.

==== Advocacy ====
The National Union of Teachers supports free school meals for all children. Fiona Twycross campaigned to persuade the Labour Party to commit to providing universal free school meals. She argues that according to the Institute for Fiscal Studies and the National Centre for Social Research, free school meals for all students significantly increases attainment in schools.

Free school meals have become an essential part of the diet of disadvantaged children. During the COVID-19 pandemic lockdown, these children were out of school and unfed. Marcus Rashford, a popular footballer, led a successful campaign to cause the government to make a U-turn and to continue to provide meals or food vouchers. The Petition that Rashford started on Free School Meals garnered substantial support, passing the 1 million signature mark on 28 October 2020.

Many have criticised school meals due to quality and portions.

== Oceania ==
=== Australia ===
The Healthy Kids Association (previously The Healthy Kids School Canteen Association) is a not-for-profit, non-governmental, health promotion organization based in Sydney, Australia. It is a peak organisation for school canteens in New South Wales and the Australian Capital Territory (ACT).

In Australia, many school canteens have returned to offering junk food, or pupils have started buying fast food outside their schools. The association has developed policies intended to counter these trends; in some schools, they have taken over providing school food.

In response to the 2002 Childhood Obesity Summit, former Premier of New South Wales Bob Carr launched the "Fresh Tastes NSW Healthy School Canteen Strategy." Healthy Kids has become a key partner of the Ministry of Health in developing this plan. The strategy is to develop a taste for healthier foods among schoolchildren by promoting and featuring healthier menu options, while limiting the availability of less nutritious foods. The program's menu guide was partially created by Rosemary Stanton.

=== New Zealand ===
In 2012, Hone Harawira MP had a private member's bill to provide free breakfast and lunches for all children in decile 1 and 2 schools in New Zealand was drawn from the ballot. The Education (Breakfast and Lunch Programmes in Schools) Amendment Bill, better known as the "Feed the Kids Bill", has been supported by a broad-based Community Coalition for Food in Schools. A 1News opinion poll found 70 percent support for the Bill's proposal.

Until 2020, New Zealand did not have any school meal programme, aside from board-run school breakfasts that were not provided by central government. After assuming office, New Zealand's Labour-led government announced 20,000 children would benefit from school lunches by 2021. Jacinda Ardern has said this programme will be dramatically expanded to 200,000 students by the end of 2021 (25% of national school rolls) should she retain office. By May 2023, the Government's NZ$130 million Ka Ora, Ka Ako free lunch school programme fed over 220,000 students at 989 schools, reaching a quarter of all school students in New Zealand.

Following the 2023 New Zealand general election, a right-wing National-led coalition government was formed. In early March 2024, ACT party leader David Seymour announced that the National-led government would review the "Ka Ora, Ka Ako" school lunch programme, citing food wastage and claiming that it did little to improve school attendance and academic achievement. On 1 May 2024, Seymour confirmed the Government would continue to fund the "Ka Ora, Ka Ako" programme for a few years until the completion of the programme's review.

On 22 October 2024, Seymour unveiled the Government's revised "Ka ora, Ka ako" free school lunch programme, which would be launched in Term 1 2024. Seymour said that the revamped programme would save NZ$130 million a year, with meals costing an average of NZ$3. Meals would consist of chicken katsu, butter chicken, lasagne, chicken pasta salad and wraps. Meals for students in Years 0 to 9 would be an average of 240 grams while meals for older students would be at least 300g with additional items including fruit, yoghurt or muesli bars. Schools would receive funding and resources to either prepare their meals internally, via iwi/hapu providers, or external suppliers including Gilmours, Foodstuffs, Watties and Hellers.

In late January 2025, the New Zealand Ministry of Education confirmed that the "Ka Oa Ka Ako" programme served 244,144 students and 1,014 schools. During the opening of the 2025 school year between late January and early February 2025, several schools including Auckland Girls' Grammar School, McAuley High School, Henderson Intermediate School, Kaitao Intermediate School and Massey Primary School reported problems with the revamped school lunch programme including late or missed deliveries, uncooked food, lack of nutrition, food wastage, ham in halal food and a shortage of vegetarian meals. Due to quality issues, some schools were forced to use their own funds to buy replacement meals for pupils.

== See also ==
- Lunch shaming
- Personal, social, health and economic education
- School breakfast club
- School feeding in low-income countries
- School Food Trust
- School Health Education Study
- School health services
- School Meals Initiative for Healthy Children
- Vegan school meal

General:

- Food choice
- Nutrition
- Childhood obesity
- Welfare
