= School Meals Initiative for Healthy Children =

School meals

The School Meals Initiative for Healthy Children (SMI) was an initiative established by the United States Department of Agriculture in 1994 to revise and update nutrition standards for school meals and require them comply with the Dietary Guidelines for Americans for children over age two. The SMI required school meals to:

- Contain less than 30 percent of calories from fat and 10 percent of calories from saturated fat over the course of a week
- Meet one-third of the Recommended Dietary Allowances (RDA) for protein, calcium, iron, vitamin A, vitamin C, and specific levels of calories for specified age groups
- Comply with the Dietary Guidelines for Americans for children over the age of 2

The SMI has been superseded by new school nutrition standards set by the Healthy, Hunger-Free Kids Act of 2010.

== See also ==
- Healthy, Hunger-Free Kids Act of 2010
- Let's Move!
