= White House Conference on Food, Nutrition, and Health =

The 1969 White House Conference on Food, Nutrition and Health was a historic first and resulted in landmark legislation. In his opening address on December 2, U.S. President Richard M. Nixon vowed "to put an end to hunger in America…for all time." The three-day gathering came at the end of a decade of social, cultural, and political change which had resulted in a sudden awareness of the widespread malnutrition and hunger afflicting many poor in the United States. Eight-hundred academics and scientists, business and civic leaders, activists, and politicians developed more than 1,800 recommendations, which were reviewed by the 2,700 conference attendees and delivered in a full report to the President on December 24, 1969. The Supplemental Nutrition Assistance Program (SNAP, formerly known as Food Stamps), Special Supplemental Nutrition Program for Women, Infants and Children (WIC), National School Lunch Program (NSLP), and the School Breakfast Program (SBP) are among the 1,400 nutrition and food assistance programs and recommendations implemented or improved as a result of the White House Conference. In May 2022, President Joe Biden announced a new White House Conference on Hunger, Nutrition and Health which was scheduled to convene on September 28, 2022, in Washington, D.C.

== Background ==
=== Hunger awareness: activists and politicians in the mid-1960s ===
A long period of prosperity due to post–World War II economic expansion resulted in a large decrease in the number of people below the poverty line during the 1960s. Still, blacks and other minorities had a poverty rate three times that of whites, and poverty in the deep South, urban ghettos, and Indian Reservations was associated with starvation, hunger, and malnutrition.

During this time of growing wealth in America, a number of events brought growing awareness of the extent of hunger and malnutrition. In 1967, Senators Robert F. Kennedy and Joseph S. Clark led a Senate subcommittee to Jackson, Mississippi to hold a hearing on poverty. Afterward, Marian Wright (now Marian Wright Edelman), a lawyer for the NAACP Legal Defense Fund, took the Senators on a tour across the Mississippi Delta, to show them the widespread poverty and hunger afflicting families and children living there. Kennedy was particularly shocked and affected and immediately began calling attention to the hunger issue.

In 1967, the Citizens' Crusade Against Poverty formed a Citizens' Board of Inquiry into Hunger and Malnutrition in the United States, producing a report that found "hunger and malnutrition affect millions of Americans and are increasing in severity every year," "Federal programs to alleviate the problem have by and large failed," and "the policies of the agricultural committees of Congress and the Department of Agriculture have discriminated against the needs of the poor and the hungry in the interests of the agricultural producers." The Board made recommendations including the declaration of a national emergency, particularly targeting 280 counties, migrant farm camps, and Indian reservations not yet served by food programs. Further, the Board advocated an overhaul of the food assistance distribution programs, including making food stamps free and nutritious school lunches available for all students and free for low-income students.

With the national extent of hunger and malnutrition unknown, the first National Nutrition Survey was mandated in 1967. Preliminary survey results were released in January 1969, in time to inform the White House Conference.

=== Hunger awareness: “CBS Reports — Hunger in America” ===
In May 1968, CBS televised the special "CBS Reports: Hunger In America," which showed children and families living in dire poverty in Virginia, Texas, and Alabama, and on an Indian reservation in Arizona. The images of starving children in America, and interviews with doctors about the conditions they observed, received wide attention.

=== Politics, policies, laws ===
The 1960s were a decade of tremendous cultural, social, and political upheaval. The civil rights, anti-Vietnam War, feminist, hippie, and other movements agitated for change and elicited, sometimes, a violent reaction. Cold War nuclear threats didn't deter the optimism, buoyed by a long stretch of global economic growth, that positive changes would come. President Lyndon B. Johnson initiated his Great Society, embracing a War on Poverty and many other legislative initiatives. Anti-hunger advocates like Robert Choate, Joseph Clark, and Robert F. Kennedy hoped Johnson would make more efforts to end hunger and malnutrition as part of the Great Society initiative, but Johnson was focused on the need to pay for the Vietnam War.

=== Commodity Surplus, Assistance, and Food Stamps ===
Beginning in the 1930s, the government began buying agricultural surplus to support farmers. The Agricultural Act of 1949 allowed commodity surplus to be used for domestic food assistance, but the food aid was devoid of choice, variety, and needed nutrients. The Food Stamp Act of 1964 allowed consumers to pick a balanced basket of food. However, food stamps had to be purchased, and the neediest families did not have the money to buy them. Alternatively, counties could choose to continue to offer surplus commodity assistance, which was free and required less certification paperwork. Many Southern counties discouraged food assistance, using restrictions and offering the food stamps for sale instead of free commodity surplus.

=== The Child Nutrition Act of 1966 ===
The Child Nutrition Act of 1966, part of Johnson's Great Society, expanded and nutritionally enhanced the National School Lunch Program which had been enacted in 1946, added a School Breakfast Program 2-year pilot, and permanently authorized the Special Milk Program.

=== Fights to reform and expand ===
Some Southern politicians did not acknowledge the extensive hunger and malnutrition in their state and sought to block improvements in food assistance during the Johnson presidency. Mississippi Congressman Jamie L. Whitten, chair of the House Appropriations Subcommittee on Agriculture, used the power of the purse strings to obstruct food assistance reform and emergency aid, including, even, for Mississippi.

In contrast to Whitten, conservative Senator Ernest Fritz Hollings of South Carolina began to address hunger and poverty in his state, prompting other congressional leaders to do the same. At the opposite end of the political spectrum, in 1968 Senator George McGovern became the top congressional food and nutrition advocate after the assassination of presidential candidate, Robert F. Kennedy.

=== 1969: Nixon, the Message to Congress, and announcement of the White House Conference ===
In a May 6, 1969, Message to Congress, President Richard Nixon described the need to:

- Initially increase but then replace the commodity distribution program;
- Increase food stamp benefits and decrease purchase requirements;
- Mandate food assistance programs in the remaining 440 counties nationally which had so far declined it;
- Eliminate county-to-county variations in eligibility requirements designed to reduce participation;
- Pilot a food program, later known as WIC, to fight malnutrition in pregnant women and infants;
- Expand the national nutrition survey;
- Create the Food and Nutrition Service to administer food assistance and nutrition efforts;
- Have the Office of Economic Opportunity redirect funds to the poorest areas to fight hunger and malnutrition and improve health.

To support his initiative, on June 11, 1969, Nixon announced the appointment of Dr. Jean Mayer to organize the White House Conference on Food, Nutrition, and Health. Mayer skillfully planned the balance of political, scientific, business-orientation, and advocacy interests among the participants, negotiating with both the White House and the many who wanted to participate.

== The Conference ==
Mayer, designed, what was in effect, a hunger conference and a nutrition conference joined into one.

=== The hunger arm ===
CBS news anchor Walter Cronkite paraphrased Nixon's opening remarks: “…the nation cannot live with its conscience if the problems are not solved.” Nixon pledged to end hunger, feed every needy child at school, and raise food stamp spending from $350 million to $2.5 billion. However, many of the hundreds of hunger activists in attendance were not convinced of Nixon's commitment. The National Welfare Rights Organization, La Raza Latinos, the Black Caucus, and others had been strongly advocating a universal guaranteed income plan at the $5,500 level or more. This was far above the $1,600 cash and $720 in food assistance bundle that Nixon's advisor, Daniel Patrick Moynihan, had been pushing in Congress. Anti-hunger attendees largely refrained from carrying out threats of disruptions to the conference, and a groundswell of moderate voices joined the hunger lobby in making demands for emergency food relief for the hungry and permanent income assistance for the poor. Even conservative corporate heads in attendance like Robert J. Stuart, Jr., the president of Quaker Oats, pressed Nixon to act immediately on hunger.

The priority list of requests which Mayer sent to the President on the last day of the Conference were for Nixon to:

1. Immediately declare a hunger emergency;
2. Set a guaranteed annual income of $5,500 for a family of four;
3. Restructure and increase food assistance;
4. Provide all school children with a free, healthy breakfast and lunch;
5. Move control of food programs from the United States Department of Agriculture (USDA) to the Department of Health, Education, and Welfare.

=== The nutrition arm ===
Prior to the conference, the 26 panels prepared hundreds of nutrition-focused recommendations, concerning, for example:

- Encouragement of breast-feeding;
- Fortification or enrichment of foods like milk and grain products;
- Universal fluoridation of water supplies;
- National nutrition monitoring;
- Food additive safety.

Consumer advocates and industry heads debated issues including food labeling, use of health claims, and revisions to "Generally Recognized As Safe" (GRAS), a designation which protects a manufacturer from needing approval for a food additive from the Food and Drug Administration (FDA.) The latter debate became particularly controversial when an association representing the largest food companies was allowed to present a pre-packaged set of GRAS recommendations for panel approval.

=== White house response ===
Responding to the pressure from the hunger activists, Nixon gave Mayer the go-ahead to announce three actions before the close of the conference:

- Forcing of food stamp programs into 307 counties in the U.S. which still had no federal food assistance program;
- Accelerated implementation of increased food stamp benefits;
- Agreement to meet immediately with six conference leaders to discuss their request for a large-scale, emergency, hunger relief effort.

=== 1,800 recommendations and more White House action ===
On December 24, 1969, Mayer presented Nixon with the completed Conference Report containing 1,800 recommendations. In return, Nixon announced expansion of food lunch programs to cover 6.6 million needy children, nearly double the number covered at that point. To accomplish this, private companies would be allowed to provide packaged lunches to schools without kitchen facilities. Nixon's total hunger efforts won praise from the biggest anti-hunger advocate in Congress, Senator George McGovern, who would soon run against Nixon in the 1972 presidential election.

== Contributions and outcomes ==
- The 1970s saw a sharp decrease in hunger and malnutrition due to food assistance, although the prevalence of hunger rose again with cuts to food programs in the early 1980s during President Ronald Reagan's Administration.
- The improvement in food security of Americans was due largely to expansion, increases, and adjustments of the food stamp program. Nixon and Moynihan's $1,600 guaranteed income program had died in the Senate along with any hope of the conference's $5,500 proposal.
- Meals on Wheels.
- School lunches were expanded, although not as much as Nixon wanted.
- WIC began as a pilot in 1972 and had quick success in healthier outcomes for women, infants, and children.
- Better nutrition and food safety standards.
- Reforms to food labeling in the early 1970s, such as the FDA's first nutrition information label in 1973.
- According to Mayer, the White House Conference on Food, Nutrition and Health permanently raised public awareness of nutrition.

== Continuing shortfalls: proposals never realized ==
- Barriers to food stamp use remain for those in need.
- Universal guaranteed income.
- Nutrition education in public schools.
- Movement of all food programs out of the USDA.
- Food labeling, health claim, safety, and additive regulations remain in need of improvement.
