= Fresh Fruit and Vegetable Program =

The Fresh Fruit and Vegetable Program (FFVP) is a federally assisted program created by the United States Department of Agriculture (USDA) to help subsidize the purchase of fresh fruits and vegetables during non-meal times during school.

== Overview ==
The FFVP was created to improve children's diets both at school and at home, increase the variety of foods available to students, and create healthier school food environments. The program focuses on providing students with fresh fruit and vegetables, as snacks, outside normal breakfast and lunch hours during the school day.

== Components ==
Fruits and vegetables are to be given as snacks outside normal mealtime hours as dictated by the National School Lunch Program (NSLP) and School Breakfast Program.

There are limitations on how produce can be prepared. Dip must be low- or non-fat, and cooked vegetables are to be limited to once a week. It is recommended to use pre-cut fruit and vegetable trays to ease storage and serving.

As of September 2016, canned, frozen, and dried produce are not reimbursed under the FFVP, although there is a bill, Improving Child Nutrition and Education Act of 2016, with a provision that increases the FFVP's scope to include canned, frozen, and dried produce.

The USDA recommends that schools also include an education section on the food the students are being served, but it is currently not a requirement.

== Eligibility ==
Elementary schools are eligible for the FFVP if at least 50% of the student body is on free or reduced price meals through the NSLP. Priority is given to schools with greater percentages of disadvantaged students. The state is in charge of making sure that all eligible schools are informed of the FFVP, and whether funding is available.

Eligible schools are in charge of sending in applications (though an incomplete application will not disqualify a school from receiving aid), and cannot violate any requirements of any other Food and Nutrition Service programs. If there is more funding than eligible schools, a district may allow schools with less than 50% participation in free and reduced-price meals. If there is not enough funding, the district is allowed to impose more stringent requirements.

Applications are to be submitted the year before the school desires the program put into place. Applications require the total number of enrolled students and the percentage who are eligible for free and reduced meal programs; a certificate of support signed by the school food manager, school principal, and the district superintendent or equivalent position; and a plan for program implementation, along with any other programs the school is implementing to decrease obesity and increase the average health of its students.

== Funding ==
The FFVP currently receives $177 million per year, as of the 2015–2016 school year, and is adjusted for inflation. Each state, including the District of Columbia, Puerto Rico, and Guam, each get 1% of annual funding, and the rest is distributed according to population. The funds are then distributed to schools to allow $50–$75 per student per year.

Current more than 25% of elementary schools in the United States are participating in the FFVP.

== History ==
The Farm Security and Rural Investment Act of 2002 authorized the FFVP pilot program in four states and one Indian Tribal Organization. As the program became more popular, its reach extended to several more states and tribal lands due to the Child Nutrition and WIC Reauthorization Act of 2004. The Agriculture, Rural Development, Food and Drug Administration, and Related Agencies Appropriations Act of 2006 (or the Fiscal Year 2006 Agriculture Appropriations Act) extended its reach further, and the Fiscal Year 2008 Omnibus Bill expanded the program to all states.

== Reception ==
Evaluations of the FFVP have been positive, with a slight increase in participating students' average fruit and vegetable consumption without a corresponding increase in daily calories. Students also had a more positive view towards fruits and vegetables during the program, and 91% teachers and other school administrators have also reported favorable opinions towards the program. Teachers observed that students are more able to focus in the evenings and aren't as hungry at the end of the day.

The FFVP also helps reduce childhood obesity and is a more cost-effective method than other efforts to reduce childhood obesity.

Although the FFVP has been largely lauded, there are a few criticisms and controversies. The biggest one is a criticism of the program's dedication to fresh produce, instead of also permitting other forms of produce – such as canned, frozen, or dried – which are frequently cheaper.

== Vs DoD Program of the similar name ==
There is another program named the Fresh Fruit and Vegetable program that is funded by the United States Department of Defense. The DoD's FFVP was created in 1996 to help schools procure more fresh fruits and vegetables for their students. The program serves as a go-between for schools and fresh produce vendors, allowing schools to order food directly from local growers, and allows schools to allocate some of their Food Distribution Program funds to fresh produce.

Schools involved in the DoA's FFVP are allowed to use funds from the DoD's FFVP in order to purchase fresh produce.
