= Indianapolis Community Food Access Coalition =

The Indianapolis Community Food Access Coalition (CFAC, or the "Coalition") was recognized by the City-County Council of Indianapolis, Indiana, as part of the Division of Community Food Nutrition and Policy, which was established at the same time. The Division is intended to rectify "racial inequality in the food system" and decrease "food insecurity in Indianapolis" by funding local food growers. The Coalition was created through Indianapolis Ordinance 337, which was proposed in November 2020 and "recognized" in January 2021.

Ordinance 337 designated the Coalition as an entity that is independent of the City government and has its own charter and by-lawys. Further, CFAC "and shall raise, receive, and spend funds independently of, and without direct control by, the city and the office of public health and safety."

== Mission ==
CFAC was created to help resolve city-wide food issues and enable communication between stakeholders in the food system, including food insecurity advocates, retailers, growers and supply chain. The main focus is to address issues of "racial food inequality," food insecurity and ensure all Indianapolis residents have access to healthy, nutritious food that supports optimal health and wellbeing.

== Structure ==
The Coalition was created to replace the Indy Food Council and is made up of city staff, leaders of various food organizations, and community members from eight of the regional neighborhoods in Indianapolis. It was created alongside IndyFAC. The Commission was established under City-County Ordinance No. 40 to provide guidance and oversight for the Coalition. The Commission represents multiple aspects of the food system, including farmers, health and transportation officials, nonprofit organizations, small businesses, community leaders, and Purdue agricultural extension workers. CFAC is affiliated with Indianapolis' Division of Community Nutrition and Food Policy.

The Division of Community Nutrition and Food Policy was created to address racial inequity in the food system, create food programs and policies, and reduce food insecurity with a focus on low-income areas and food deserts throughout Indianapolis. It includes and oversees both the Coalition and the Commission. The coalition operates independently of the Indianapolis government, but is funded through the city's Office of Public Health and Safety and also is charged with obtaining outside funding.

== History ==
Although the City-County Council recognized and established CFAC in January 2021, it was not created until May 16, 2024.

CFAC publicly launched with a community potluck on June 25, 2024, after several meetings at the Indianapolis Liberation Center.

Between its recognition and its official creation in June 2024, however, CFAC was used on applications for grants by another organization, the Indianapolis Community Food Access Advisory Commission. For example, a 2022 United States Department of Agriculture grant from Jump IN. The chief executive officer of Jump IN, Julie Burns, has never been a member of CFAC but has been at the head of INDYFAC. According to Burns, she CFAC to designate around "1,200 people who had signed up for a digital newsletter" from IndyFAC.

On July 14, 2024, CFAC held a press conference announcing the four individuals requested by the Mayor to be appointed to IndyFAC).

The current president of CFAC is Sierra Nuckols, an Indianapolis woman who was raised by a young mother who both suffered from racial inequality and the lack of accessible healthy food in Indianapolis.

== See also ==
- Hunger in the United States
- Food banks
