= Food Distribution Program on Indian Reservations =

Alternative to the Food Stamp Program

The Food Distribution Program on Indian Reservations (FDPIR) is a United States federal food assistance program that provides food to eligible households on Indian reservations, eligible American Indian households in approved areas near reservations, or in Oklahoma. FDPIR is federally administered by the Food and Nutrition Service (FNS), an agency of the U.S. Department of Agriculture (USDA), and locally by Indian tribal organizations (ITOs) or state agencies (SAs). FDPIR serves as an alternative to the Supplemental Nutrition Assistance Program (SNAP); households cannot participate in both programs in the same month. Local administering agencies also provide nutrition education to participants.

As of 2026, approximately 280 tribes administer FDPIR through 107 ITOs and three state agencies. In fiscal year 2024, an average of 53,500 people participated in FDPIR monthly. FDPIR is one of 16 nutrition assistance programs administered by the USDA's Food and Nutrition Administration.

Participants select foods for a monthly package from categories including fruits and vegetables, grains, dairy products, meat and other protein foods, and cooking oils. Fruits and vegetables are available in fresh, frozen, canned, dried, and juiced forms.

== Need for the program ==
Food insecurity describes being unable to consistently afford and access food needed for a healthy diet. From 2000 to 2010, twenty-five percent of indigenous people in the US reported that they consistently face food insecurity. Additionally, American Indians and Alaskan Natives are the demographic groups that ranked highest in the categories of being “food insecure” and “very low food secure” in the nation from 2016 to 2021. Food insecurity is one of the results that living in more rural areas can cause to indigenous folk. Living in rural areas that are far away from direct lines of food causes markets in the areas to have disproportionately higher food prices to match the extra effort needed to restock the markets, and paired with how indigenous people usually lack personal transportation, make food security more difficult to achieve. Indigenous communities living in harder to supply and less developed areas also discourages supermarket companies from opening up stores in these areas and sustaining them. This is an example of supermarket redlining, causing areas that lack accessibility to supermarkets to be correlated with low-income neighborhoods, including indigenous communities and reservations. This leads to only a select few market stores being available for indigenous folk to get their groceries from, causing higher inaccessibility of food. These factors combined create food deserts, defined as areas that have limited access to a variety of healthy, affordable foods.

Many reservation officials reported that for many of their American Indian residents, FDPIR was their primary source of food due to inaccessibility to food markets and also their low incomes making it difficult to budget for nutritional foods. The program has been a valuable alternative to the SNAP program as many indigenous families cannot regularly access SNAP offices or grocery stores that accept SNAP benefits. FDPIR was able to provide American Indians consistent access to foods that helped create more well-rounded diets, addressing many food insecurity concerns of indigenous households, emphasizing the need for the program's continuation.

== Eligibility ==
American Indians who are classified as being low-income and non-Indians who reside on a reservation, and individuals in households living in approved areas near a reservation or in Oklahoma that contain at least one person who is a member of a federally recognized tribe, are eligible to participate in FDPIR.

Applicants may be required to provide documents including but not limited to: pay check stubs, Social Security, Supplemental Security Income benefits, TANF (Temporary Assistance to Needy Families), General Assistance, VA (Veterans benefits), Pensions or retirement benefits, Unemployment or Workers Compensation benefits, Child Support or Alimony, Dependent Care Expenses, and/or bank account statements.

Households are certified based on income and non-financial standards determined by the Federal government, and must be recertified at least every 12 months. Elderly and disabled households may be certified for up to 24 months. Income standards vary by household size and are based on 100% of the Federal Poverty Guidelines adjusted by the applicable SNAP standard deduction. Households must be re-certified at least every 12 months, but elderly and disabled households may be certified for up to 24 months. Households may not participate in FDPIR and SNAP in the same month.

== Evaluation ==
According to the USDA's evaluation of the FDPIR, half of local FDPIR programs serve fewer than 250 households per month. The average administrative costs per household ranged from $614 (small programs) to $287 among large programs. Federal regulations do not require local FDPIR programs to offer extensive nutrition education services to program participants. Of those programs evaluated, over 25% reported no nutrition education budget.

There is a wide range of over 100 food options for Native Americans to choose for their monthly food disbursements, with some areas of the United States offering traditional indigenous food choices such as bison, wild salmon, wild rice, and blue cornmeal. These options have been valuable with the increase in laws that sometimes ban indigenous folk from hunting, care of livestock, and farming on traditional agricultural lands. Nutrition-related education can help indigenous folk learn about non-traditional foods, a variety of meals they can make out of them, and overall take the most advantages from their monthly food packages.

The FDPIRs design places a large responsibility on individual participants to create and prepare a nutritious diet from the foods provided. Participants are responsible for selecting their foods, developing cooking skills, and designing meals that constitute a nutritious diet.

In order for the success of the FDPIR to be accurately measured, additional and extensive research must be conducted.
