= Robert B. Choate Jr. =

American businessman

Robert Burnett Choate Jr. (November 6, 1924 – May 3, 2009) was an American businessman, political activist, and self-described "citizen lobbyist" most famous for his work in consumer protection.

== Life ==
Born in Boston, Massachusetts, the son of the wealthy publisher of the Boston Herald, Choate attended the Phillips Exeter Academy in New Hampshire for his high school education. After World War II, during which he served in the United States Navy, he received his bachelor's degree in civil engineering from the University of California, Berkeley in 1949. Subsequently, he relocated to Phoenix, Arizona, where he worked as a construction engineer and became wealthy in his own right through real estate investments.

In the late 1950s, during a trip abroad, he contracted a strain of hepatitis. While recuperating, he read the memoirs of Walter Francis White, the former leader of the National Association for the Advancement of Colored People. Choate, a lifelong Republican, became inspired to use his wealth to battle what he saw as the greatest social ills afflicting America: poverty, hunger, and a lack of civil and political rights for African Americans and other minority groups.

Among the ventures he undertook to that end over the next several decades were the publishing of a magazine dedicated to social justice, called Reveille; founding a number of social welfare programs and charities in the Phoenix area; organizing a Southwest conference on poverty, which included such speakers as Vice President Hubert Humphrey and Peace Corps director Sargent Shriver; working in Washington, D.C. as a lobbyist for groups such as the Citizens Crusade Against Poverty; and serving as a consultant to the Department of Health, Education, and Welfare, where he was credited with initiating a national study on malnutrition. His efforts were later credited with the formation of the United States Senate Select Committee on Nutrition and Human Needs, which operated from 1968 to 1977, and the creation of the White House Conference on Food, Nutrition, and Health, which met in 1969.

In September 1970, Choate became famous when he testified before the Committee on Nutrition and Human Needs on the nutritional content (specifically, vitamins, dietary minerals, and protein) of the 60 bestselling brands of dry breakfast cereal in the United States. Choate told the Committee, that, on a scale from 0 to 900, with 900 being the best, 40 of the cereals ranked below 100 and were therefore "empty calories" which "fatten but do little to prevent malnutrition." Only three products—Kellogg Company's Product 19 and General Mills' Kaboom and Total—scored higher than 700. Choate's testimony received publicity nationally (with a headline in Time, "Breakfast of Chumps?"), sparking a public relations war between Choate and the various cereal companies. The companies denied Choate's charges, but the public eventually sided with him, and the companies decided to voluntarily add nutrition facts labels to their products' boxes.

In later years, Choate continued his education, receiving a master's degree in education from Harvard University, before relocating to California, where he started Operation Civic Serve, a non-profit organization dedicated to promoting volunteering amongst college students. On May 3, 2009, he died of natural causes in a retirement community in Lemon Grove, California. He was survived by four children from two of his three marriages, each of which ended in divorce, and three grandchildren.
