= Jean Mayer =

French-American scientist (1920–1993)

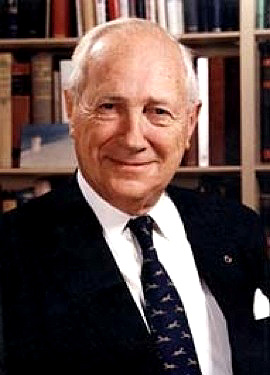

10th President of Tufts University
- In office 1976–1993
- Preceded by: Burton Crosby Hallowell
- Succeeded by: John DiBiaggio

Personal details
- Born: April 19, 1920 Paris, France
- Died: January 1, 1993 (aged 72) Medford, Massachusetts

Jean Mayer (19 April 1920 – 1 January 1993) was a French-American scientist best known for his research on the physiological bases of hunger and the metabolism of essential nutrients, and for his role in shaping policy on world hunger at both the national and international levels. As a professor at the Harvard School of Public Health, Mayer directed a laboratory that did groundbreaking work on the hypothalamic regulation of obesity and various metabolic disorders. In 1968-69, having worked as an adviser to the World Health Organization and UNICEF, he was appointed principal organizer and chair of the first White House Conference on Food, Nutrition, and Health. At Harvard University, he served as Master of Dudley House before leaving in 1976 to become the tenth President of Tufts University in Medford, Massachusetts, where he is given credit for having brought about an unprecedented rise in the university's national reputation. He died unexpectedly on 1 January 1993.

== Early life and education ==
Mayer was born in Paris in 1920 into a distinguished French scientific family. His father, André Mayer, was a celebrated physiologist at the Collège de France, his mother an outstanding doctoral student in André Mayer's laboratory when they met. Jean Mayer's sister, Dr. Geneviève Massé would become a Professor of Biostatistics at the French National Superior School of Public Health.

Mayer worked in his father's laboratory as a schoolboy, while devoting the greater part of his intellectual energies to mathematics—differential and integral calculus, analytical geometry, series and functions, and theoretical physics. He later made extensive use of mathematical models in his work on the physiology of hunger and nutrition. At age nineteen, he was admitted to the École Normale Superieure as one of only 20 science students from all of France. At the outbreak of World War II, he had earned a bachelor's degree in Philosophy (summa cum laude), a bachelor's degree in Mathematics (magna cum laude), and a master's degree in Physics and Chemistry.

== World War II ==
With France's declaration of war on Germany in 1939, Mayer enlisted in the Ecole Normale Superieure Artillery Training Unit. In 1940, his was one of the units that provided a protective ring around the British expeditionary force on the beaches during the Dunkirk evacuation, gaining time for the evacuation of the British Expeditionary Force (BEF) across the English Channel. Taken prisoner by the Germans, Mayer shot a guard and managed a narrow escape, making his way to southern France. A Free French sympathizer with a high position in the Vichy government secretly supplied him with a passport and papers permitting his escape to Algeria, Morocco, Martinique and Guadeloupe. He would eventually make his way to the United States, where his father, who immediately before the outbreak of war had been invited to give the Lowell Lectures at Harvard, was in Cambridge, Massachusetts, with Mayer's mother and sister. On his visit to them Mayer met Elizabeth Van Huysen, who would become his wife.

By the end of 1941, Charles de Gaulle had formed the Free French as an army and government in exile. Mayer reenlisted in the Free French Forces, at first serving as a gunnery officer on convoy duty in the North Atlantic. When one convoy was forced back by weather and U-Boat attacks into harbor at Halifax, Nova Scotia, Elizabeth Van Huysen came up to Halifax from Boston and the two were married. They had a honeymoon of less than 24 hours before the convoy sailed again. Mayer would not return to America until 1945.

In North Africa, Mayer served as commander of an artillery battery in the Colonial and Marine First Free French Division that accompanied the British Eighth Army at the second battle of El Alamein, following its victory there with a long advance into Libya and Tunisia. With the Tunisian campaign completed, he was detached to the staff of the War Ministry in Algeria, received training in ship-to-shore attacks and landings, and landed with the First Free French Division—by then part of the U.S. Fifth Army—south of Naples.

Mayer had been awarded the Croix de Guerre for his escape from German captivity. At the Battle of Monte Cassino in the Italian campaign, he would be awarded another for risking his life as forward observer of the heavy (155mm howitzer) battalion. After the D-Day landings, he would land in the south of France to command a Free French infantry regiment—made up largely of boys too young to have been drafted for forced labor in Germany and older men who had served in World War I—in the Colmar Pocket, managing to hold the line along the Vosges against attack by the elite Hermann Goering SS Division. He would emerge from this campaign with two palms to his Croix de Guerre, the Resistance Medal, and the Legion of Honour, and from the war with 14 decorations in all.

== Scientific research ==
At war's end, Mayer joined his wife in the United States and received a small grant from the Rockefeller Foundation for graduate work in physiological chemistry. He elected to attend Yale, which had a leading faculty—among them C.N.H. Long, Abraham White, John Fulton, Donald Barron and Desmond Bonnycastle—in his area of interest. Mayer would later recall that, as a military veteran and son of a distinguished French physiologist, he was accepted by the faculty as a junior colleague, being made a member of the Faculty Club and put in charge of the biochemistry laboratory where medical students performed practical exercises. The salary of eighteen hundred dollars turned out to be crucial to his household income when his first son, André, the first of five Mayer children, was born in 1946.

Having earned a Ph.D. in Physiological Chemistry at Yale in 1948 and a Doctor of Science degree in Physiology at the Sorbonne in 1950, Mayer accepted the offer of a Professorship from the Harvard School of Public Health in 1950. He would direct a laboratory in the School of Nutrition there until 1976. Its breakthrough in discovering the physiological bases of hunger and food metabolism would occur when Mayer and one of his graduate students, Norman Marshall, discovered that the body's hunger mechanisms were controlled by the sensitivity of the hypothalamus to glucose under varying conditions. (In technical terms, their discovery was that gold thioglucose, which was known to cause obesity in mice, did so because the gold caused destruction of the ventromedial hypothalamus. Experiments then showed that other substances containing gold components—gold thiomalate, gold thiogalactose, gold thioglycero, etc.—did not have the same effect, suggesting that it was the special affinity of this portion of the hypothalamus for glucose that led first to destruction by the heavy metal and then, as a direct consequence, to obesity due to a failure of appetite regulation.) This basic insight would lead, after many more years of research and experimentation, to Mayer's greatest contribution: the so-called glucostatic theory of the regulation of food intake.

== Public service ==
Mayer's growing reputation as a researcher who was translating the somewhat vague field of nutrition into terms of hard or basic science would lead to numerous invitations to play a role in public policy on matters of nutrition and hunger. During his Harvard years, he would serve as a consultant to the World Health Organization and UNICEF, as the head of a United Nations Task Force on Child Nutrition, as Chair of the U.S. National Council on Hunger and Malnutrition in the U.S.(1968–69)—the now-familiar Food Stamps program would emerge from the Council's findings—Chairman of the First White House Conference on Food, Nutrition, and Health (1969–70), and adviser to many foundations, community action organizations, and scientific societies. He would also become a public voice on "popular" health and nutrition issues, writing a syndicated column that appeared twice weekly in 100 of the largest newspapers in the United States, with a combined circulation of 35 million readers.

A developing interest in higher education, both at the level of institutional policy and of undergraduate and graduate education, led in 1973 to Mayer's accepting an appointment as Master of Dudley House, one of thirteen undergraduate houses built as Harvard's counterparts of the Oxford and Cambridge colleges. In an earlier period, Dudley House had served the needs of Harvard's commuter students. In the wake of the widespread cultural upheaval of the 1960s, it had expanded to become a center of undergraduate life at Harvard, embracing the Dudley Coop—an undergraduate cooperative house or commune—a resident population of undergraduates in Apley Court and Claverly Hall, and a substantial number of students who had chosen to live off campus in Cambridge and environs after a one or two years' experience of dormitory life.

Mayer is remembered as having brought with him a sense of energy and excitement, playing a leading role in the development of internal "house courses," with classes for Dudley students taught by faculty members of its Senior Common Room, bringing in personal friends such as Daniel Patrick Moynihan and George McGovern as after-dinner speakers at House dinners, and adding faculty from Harvard Medical School and the Harvard School of Public Health to a Senior Common Room already containing as longtime members such Arts and Sciences faculty as philosopher Nelson Goodman, sociologist Seymour Martin Lipset, physicist Robert Pound, ethnobotanist Richard Evans Schultes, legal scholar Roger Fisher, and topologist Arthur Lee Loeb, who would later succeed John Mayer as Master of Dudley. The House became during Mayer's mastership — remembered for the outstanding Dudley symposium series, folk and jazz concerts, readings by such poets and authors as Anne Sexton and John Updike, a pioneering Film Society whose showings of rare and classic films drew students from across campus, dance recitals and small-cast theatrical productions — a vital center of undergraduate life.

== Tufts presidency ==
In 1976, Mayer became the tenth president of Tufts University. Few present at his installation ceremony on July 1, 1976, wrote a Harvard friend and colleague who would ultimately join him at Tufts, realized that "on that day Tufts University ceased to be a sleepy little school with a good undergraduate program and some very good graduate schools and started to become a first-rate university with an international reputation."

Mayer's years at Tufts would become legendary. At a school that had suffered from chronic financial deficits and had virtually no endowment, he launched a fund-raising campaign that raised $100 million, followed immediately by a campaign that raised $200 million. Given a faculty that had been lenient in granting tenure, he insisted on distinction in both teaching and research as criteria for promotion and tenure, personally reading tenure files on every case that came up in the university during his presidency.

Mayer arrived at Tufts after a long decline in applications, at a point when admissions had essentially become non-selective. As news of his presidency spread, applications increased. In his third year in office, 400 students more than the number predicted by the admissions office accepted Tufts' offer of admission, creating a shortage of dormitory rooms. Mayer's solution was to rent a hotel in Harvard Square for four years and run a connecting bus service, explaining to students and parents that this was the best of all possible worlds: a Tufts education and living in Harvard Square. "As the competition to get into Tufts increased, the quality of the students soared. The percentage of incoming freshmen in the top 10% of their high school class rose from 38% in 1976 to 74% in 1992." The momentum would continue past the period of Mayer's presidency. For the class of 2020, Tufts accepted 2,889 or 14.3% of 20,223 applicants an all-time low. For the matriculating class of 2016, 91% of incoming freshmen ranked in the top 10% of their high school class.

While insisting on maintaining the highest quality of undergraduate education, Mayer transformed Tufts into a major research university with, especially, graduate programs and research units in the basic sciences. During his presidency, he would create the Sackler School of Graduate Biomedical Sciences, the Tufts Center for Environmental Management, and the Friedman School of Nutrition Science and Policy, while increasing Tufts' international presence with the Tufts European Studies Center in Talloires, France, housed in the Priory of an 11th-century Benedictine monastery. He would also oversee the creation of the School of Veterinary Medicine on a separate campus in Grafton, Massachusetts, and would create new interconnections between the Fletcher School of Law and Diplomacy, Tufts Medical School, and the undergraduate college.

After Mayer's death in 1993, a long-time faculty member and Tufts Provost would judge his presidency to have been a time of revolutionary change:

He arrived at Tufts in a time of uncertainty for the university, when the faculty felt shaken by the events of the 1970s that had left us weakened, vulnerable, and lacking in the confidence to move forward. There was a sense of paralysis, as we watched ourselves slip into a kind of frumpy mediocrity, without the resources or the will to pull ourselves forward. The 1973 self-study document A Changing University in a Changing Time had said it all: The next five years will be tough, but the ten years after that will be worse. This was a feeling shared by everyone in the Tufts community. Then came Jean Mayer. ... He represented a style of American college and university presidents who were becoming increasingly rare: the genuine academic leader, in charge of the intellectual enterprise from start to finish. He was president of only one institution, for which he was one of a kind.

== Controversy ==
In 1965, Mayer stated that low carb diets were tantamount to mass murder.

== Death ==
Mayer died at age 72 on 1 January 1993, of a heart attack while vacationing in Sarasota, Florida.
