= Food insecurity and hunger in the United States =

Food insecurity

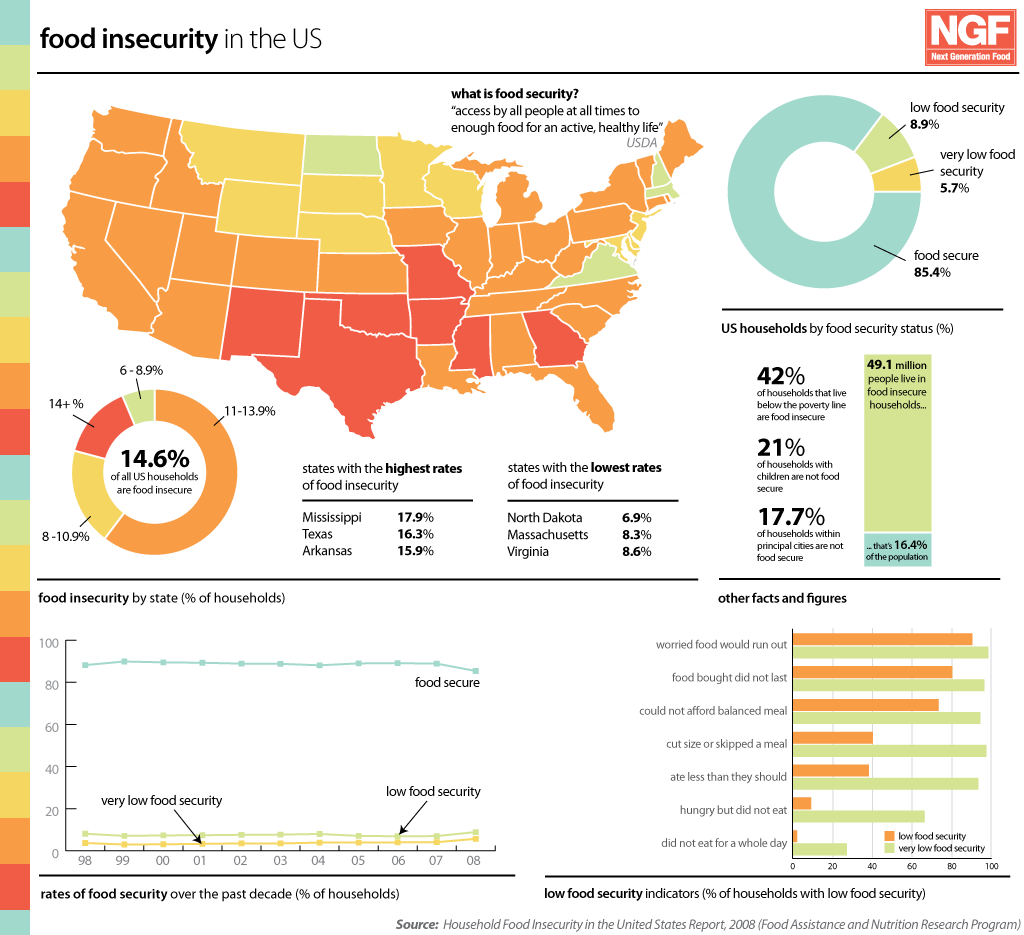
Infographic about food insecurity in the US in 2008

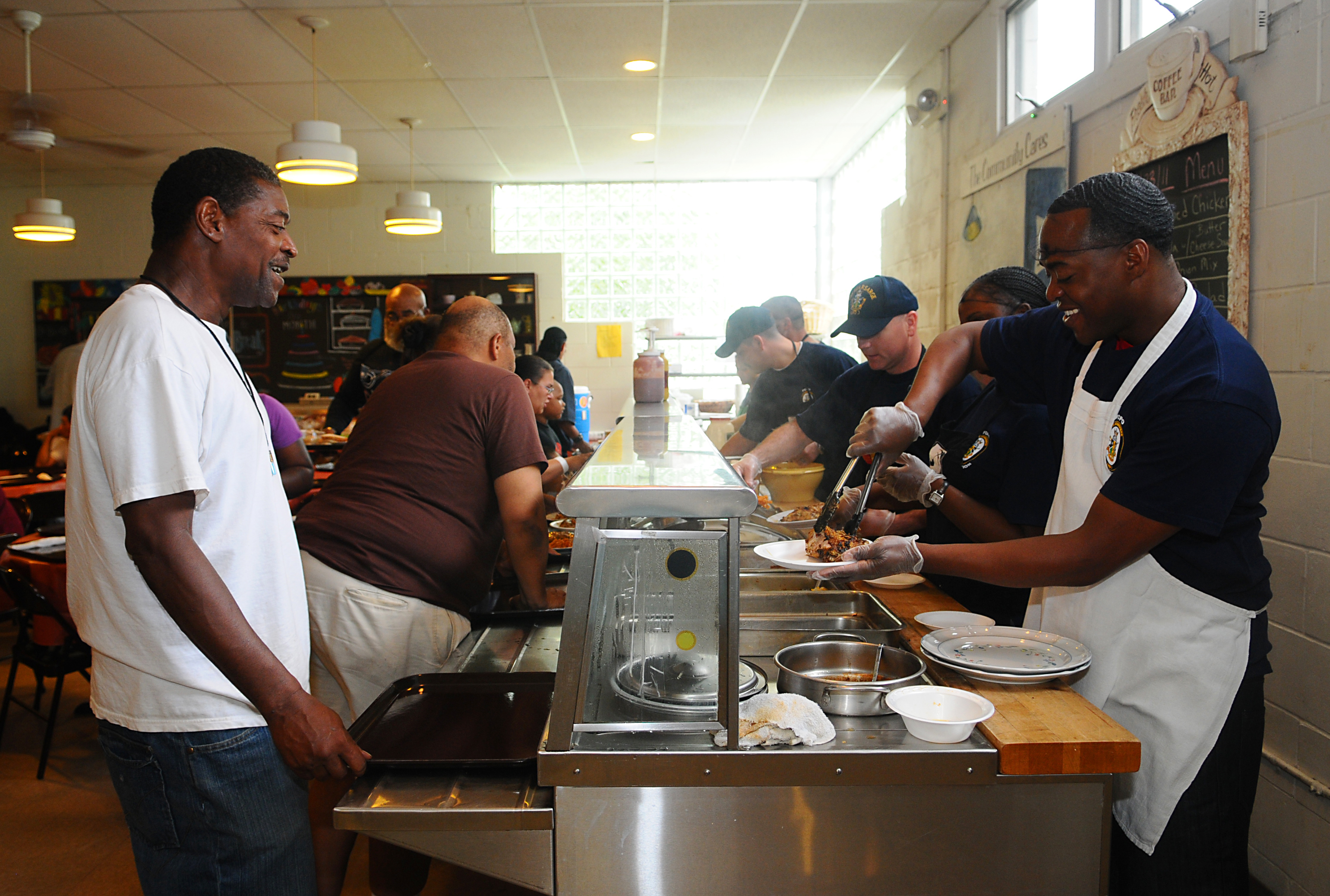
Members of the United States Navy serving hungry Americans at a soup kitchen in Red Bank, New Jersey, during a 2011 community service project

Food insecurity and hunger in the United States of America affects millions of Americans, including some who are middle class, or who are in households where all adults are in work. The United States produces far more food than it needs for domestic consumption; however, hunger within the U.S. is primarily caused by some Americans having insufficient money to buy food for themselves or their families. Additional causes of hunger and food insecurity include neighborhood deprivation and agricultural policy. Hunger is addressed by a mix of public and private food aid provision. Public interventions include changes to agricultural policy, the construction of supermarkets in underserved neighborhoods, investment in transportation infrastructure, and the development of community gardens. Private aid can be provided through examples such as food pantries, soup kitchens, food banks, and food rescue organizations.

Reliance on food banks has led to a rise in obesity and diabetes within the food insecure community. Many foods in food banks are highly processed and low in nutritional value leading to further health effects. One study showed 33% of American households visiting food pantries had diabetes. Food insecure individuals living in low-income communities experience higher rates of chronic disease, leading to healthcare costs and more financial hardships.

Historically, the U.S. was a world leader in reducing hunger both domestically and internationally. In the latter half of the twentieth century, other advanced economies in Europe and Asia began to overtake the U.S. in terms of reducing hunger among their own populations. In 2011, a report presented in the New York Times found that among 20 economies recognized as advanced by the International Monetary Fund and for which comparative rankings for food security were available, the U.S. was joint worst. Nonetheless, in March 2013, the Global Food Security Index ranked the U.S. number one for food affordability and overall food security. The Human Rights Measurement Initiative finds that the US is achieving 87.6% of what should be possible at their income level for fulfilling the right to food.

In 2024, 13.7 percent of U.S. households, about 18.3 million, were food insecure at some point during the year. Another 5.4 percent, about 7.2 million households, experienced very low food security. Neither prevalence estimate was statistically different from 2023. Surveys have consistently found much higher levels of food insecurity for students, with a 2019 study finding that over 40% of US undergraduate students experienced food insecurity. Indicators suggested the prevalence of food insecurity for US households approximately doubled during the COVID-19 pandemic, with an especially sharp rise for households with young children.

== Food insecurity ==
Food insecurity is defined at a household level as not having adequate food for any household member due to finances. The step beyond this is very low food security, which is having six (for families without children) to eight (for families with children) or more food insecure conditions in the U.S. Department of Agriculture, Food Security Supplement Survey. To be very low food secure means members of the household disrupt their food intake due to financial reasons.

These conditions are many: worrying about running out of food, that food bought does not last, a lack of a balanced diet, adults cutting down portion sizes or out meals entirely, eating less than what they felt they should, being hungry and not eating, unintended weight loss, not eating for whole days (repeatedly), due to financial reasons.

Food insecurity is closely related to poverty but is not mutually exclusive. Food insecurity does not exist in isolation and is just one individual aspect in the multiple factors of social determinants regarding health

According to the United States Department of Agriculture (USDA), food insecurity is "a household-level economic and social condition of limited or uncertain access to adequate food." Hunger is defined as "an individual-level physiological condition that may result from food insecurity."

The USDA has also created a language to describe various severities of food insecurity. High food security occurs when there are "no reported indications of food-access problems or limitations". Marginal food security occurs when there are one to two reported indications of "food-access problems or limitations" such as anxiety over food shortages in the household but no observable changes in food intake or dietary patterns. Low food security, previously called food insecurity without hunger, occurs when individuals experience a decrease in the "quality, variety, or desirability of diet" but do not exhibit reduced food intake. Very low food security, previously called food insecurity with hunger, is characterized by "multiple indications of disrupted eating patterns and reduced food intake."

== Causes ==
Hunger and food insecurity in the United States is both a symptom and consequence of a complex combination of factors, including but not limited to poverty, housing insecurity, environmental justice, unemployment, economic inequality, systemic racism, and other national policies and protections. There is not a single cause attributed to hunger and there is much debate over who or what is responsible for the prevalence of hunger in the United States.

=== Hunger and poverty ===
Researchers most commonly focus on the link between hunger and poverty. The federal poverty level is defined as "the minimum amount of income that a household needs to be able to afford housing, food, and other basic necessities." As of 2020, the federal poverty level for a family of four was $26,200.

Based on her research on poverty, Pennsylvania State University economic geographer Amy Glasmeier claims that when individuals live at, slightly above, or below the poverty line, unexpected expenses contribute to individuals reducing their food intake. Medical emergencies have a significant impact on poor families due to the high cost of medical care and hospital visits. Also, urgent car repairs reduce a family's ability to provide food, since the issue must be addressed in order to allow individuals to travel to and from work. Although income cannot be labeled as the sole cause of hunger, it plays a key role in determining if people possess the means to provide basic needs to themselves and their family.

The loss of a job reflects a core issue that contributes to hunger—employment insecurity. People who live in areas with higher unemployment rates and who have a minimal or very low amount of liquid assets are shown to be more likely to experience hunger or food insecurity. The complex interactions between a person's job status, income and benefits, and the number of dependents they must provide for, influence the impact of hunger on a family. For example, food insecurity often increases with the number of additional children in the household due to the negative impact on wage labor hours and an increase in the household's overall food needs.

=== Low-income and low access communities ===
==== Food deserts ====
Location plays a critical role in access to affordable and nutritious food. People who live in food deserts are more likely to experience food insecurity because food is harder to obtain based on where they live. Living in low-income, low access communities that are considered food deserts can prevent individuals from easily accessing healthy food markets and grocery stores due to lack of availability. Lack of access to grocery stores often leads to reliance on corner stores and convenience stores for food. These stores usually offer less nutritious foods, which causes dietary issues in food insecure populations, such as high rates of diabetes.

Research has expanded the definition of grocery store availability to food to include store quality, community acceptability, health and unhealthy food-marketing practices, product quality, and affordability.

There are several theories that attempt to explain why food deserts form. One theory proposes that the expansion of large chain supermarkets results in the closure of smaller-sized, independent neighborhood grocery stores. Market competition thereby produces a void of healthy food retailers in low-income neighborhoods.

Another theory suggests that in the period between 1970 and 1988, there was increasing economic segregation, with a large proportion of wealthy households moving from inner cities to more suburban areas. As a result, the median income in the inner cities rapidly decreased, causing a substantial proportion of supermarkets in these areas to close. Furthermore, business owners and managers are often discouraged from establishing grocery stores in low-income neighborhoods due to reduced demand for low-skilled workers, low-wage competition from international markets, zoning laws, and inaccurate perceptions about these areas.

==== Transportation ====
Transportation is a large issue for low-income individuals who live in food deserts. Thus, some argue that the federal government needs to encourage the building of grocery stores, food hubs, and food parcels in these neighborhoods. In urban areas, people living in lower income communities may be more unlikely to easily and regularly access grocery stores that tend to be located far from their home. Single mothers, individuals of color or those living with disabilities have much less access to grocery stores as well. Another idea could be the addition of smaller food hubs within food deserts to increase access.

==== Social inequality ====
Social inequality is one of the major reasons for nutritional inequalities across America. There is a direct linear relation between socioeconomic status versus malnutrition. People with poor living conditions, less education, less money, and from disadvantaged neighborhoods may experience food insecurity and face less healthy eating patterns, which resulting in a higher level of diet-related health issues. According to the United States Department of Agriculture (USDA) Economic Research Service, 10.2 percent (13.5 million) of US household has food insecurity in 2021. Although this number seems low, accessibility of dietary quality among the higher socioeconomic status American has better reach for healthy dietary quality food compared to the lowered economic status American, and gap between higher and lower socioeconomic status is going up every day. This is happening due to income inequality, higher cost of healthy food, lack of proper education on nutritional health, food shortages, and lack of government influence to establish health equity.

==== Housing and neighborhood deprivation ====
An additional contributor to hunger and food insecurity in the U.S.A is neighborhood deprivation. According to the Health & Place Journal, neighborhood deprivation is the tendency for low-income, minority neighborhoods to have greater exposure to unhealthy tobacco and alcohol advertisements, a fewer number of pharmacies with fewer medications, and a scarcity of grocery stores offering healthy food options in comparison to small convenience stores and fast-food restaurants.

Studies have shown that within these food deserts there exists distinct racial disparities. For example, compared to predominately white neighborhoods, predominately black neighborhoods have been reported to have half the number of chain supermarkets available to residents.

=== Agricultural policy ===
Another cause of hunger is related to agricultural policy. Due to the heavy subsidization of crops such as corn and soybeans, healthy foods such as fruits and vegetables are produced in lesser abundance and generally cost more than highly processed, packaged goods. Because unhealthful food items are readily available at much lower prices than fruits and vegetables, low-income populations often heavily rely on these foods for sustenance. As a result, the poorest people in the United States are often simultaneously undernourished and overweight or obese. This is because highly processed, packaged goods generally contain high amounts of calories in the form of fat and added sugars yet provide very limited amounts of essential micronutrients. These foods are thus said to provide "empty calories".

=== No right to food for US citizens ===
In 2017, the US Mission to International Organizations in Geneva explained,

"Domestically, the United States pursues policies that promote access to food, and it is our objective to achieve a world where everyone has adequate access to food, but we do not treat the right to food as an enforceable obligation."

The US is not a signatory of Article 11 of the International Covenant on Economic, Social, and Cultural Rights, which recognizes "the fundamental right of everyone to be free from hunger," and has been adopted by 158 countries. Activists note that "United States opposition to the right to adequate food and nutrition (RtFN) has endured through Democratic and Republican administrations."

Holding the federal government responsible for ensuring the population is fed has been criticized as "nanny government". The right to food in the US has been criticized as being "associated with un-American and socialist political systems", "too expensive", and as "not the American way, which is self-reliance." Anti-hunger activists have countered that "It makes no political sense for the US to continue to argue that HRF [the human right to food] and other economic rights are 'not our culture' when the US pressures other nations to accept and embrace universal civil-political rights that some argue are not their culture."

Legal scholars have proposed that the United States adopt a human rights framework for food policy similar to those implemented in other countries. According to a 2016 analysis in the Vermont Law Review, such frameworks typically include framework legislation codifying to challenge government failures, and nutrition floors establishing minimum standards for assistance programs. Research argues that current US food programs, including SNAP, function as discretionary policy choicesrather than enforceable entitlements, thereby illustrating how benefit levels and eligibility can be reduced through legislative action without triggering legal protections.

Olivier De Schutter, former UN Special Rapporteur on the Right to Food, notes that one difficulty in promoting a right to food in the United States is a "constitutional tradition that sees human rights as 'negative' rights—rights against government—not 'positive' rights that can be used to oblige government to take action to secure people's livelihoods."

The Constitution of the United States "does not contain provisions related to the right to adequate food," according to the FAO.

Franklin D. Roosevelt proposed that a Second Bill of Rights was needed to ensure the right to food. The phrase "freedom from want" in Roosevelt's Four Freedoms has also been considered to encompass a right to food.

A 2009 article in the American Journal of Public Health declared that "Adopting key elements of the human rights framework is the obvious next step in improving human nutrition and well-being."

It characterizes current US domestic policy on hunger as being needs-based rather than rights-based, stating:

The emphasis on charity for solving food insecurity and hunger is a "needs-based" approach to food. The needs-based approach assumes that people who lack access to food are passive recipients in need of direct assistance. Programs and policy efforts that use this approach tend to provide assistance without expectation of action from the recipient, without obligation and without legal protections.

Because "there is no popularly conceived, comprehensive plan in the U.S. with measurable benchmarks to assess the success or failures of the present approach [to hunger]," it is difficult for the US public to hold "government actors accountable to progressively improving food and nutrition status."

In 2014, the American Bar Association adopted a resolution urging the US government "to make the realization of a human right to adequate food a principal objective of U.S. domestic policy."

An August 2019 article explains that the Supplemental Nutrition Assistance Program (SNAP, formerly known as the Food Stamp Program) only partially fulfills the criteria set out by a right to food.

== Health consequences ==
Hunger can manifest a multitude of health consequences, including mental, emotional, and physical symptoms and signs. A person who is experiencing hunger may suffer from swelling, dizziness, dry and cracked skin along with feelings of coldness. Signs may be thinning of the face, pale flaky skin, low blood pressure, low pulse, low temperature and cold extremities. Other signs could include: vitamin deficiency, osteocalcin, anemia, muscle tenderness, weakening of the muscular system, loss of sensation in extremities, heart failure, cracked lips, diarrhea and dementia. Severe hunger can lead to the shrinking of the digestive system tract, promote bacterial growth in the intestines, deterioration in the heart and kidney function, impair the immune system.

=== Diabetes and obesity ===
The foods available on the market cater to humans' biological preferences of salt, sugar, and fat, which can lead to harmful diseases like obesity and diabetes from overconsumption. The consumption of unhealthy food is the leading cause of non-communicable diseases in the United States. The increase in obesity has only risen over the years, with the rate at 42.4% as of 2017–18. Ultimately, the cause of obesity is consuming more energy than is expended and developing excess fatty tissue as a result. There are several etiological reasons for obesity and diabetes, so there is not a one-size-fits-all. Evidence suggests that certain people are genetically predisposed to obesity if they are in an environment that promotes obesity. People who consume excess sugar and saturated fats are more likely to develop diabetes because the body becomes resistant to insulin which regulates blood sugar levels. Overconsumption-related diseases disproportionately affect people of color and people of low economic status, as they may purchase affordable calorie-dense (yet nutritionally lacking) foods. Black and Hispanic people. are more likely to suffer from obesity and type two diabetes as well as other chronic consumption-related diseases.

Another dimension that may result in obesity is the utilization of food pantries. Food insecure individuals have turned to food banks, which in turn has led to a rise in obesity and diabetes within the food insecure community. Many foods offered to clients in food banks are high in processed sugars and salts and low in vitamin and mineral content. The low nutritional quality of foods available to clientele at food banks has led to further health effects, which are often interconnected and reinforce one another over time. A study showed 33% of American households visiting food pantries had diabetes

President Ronald Reagan was opposed to government interference in American life, and his philosophy extended to business. He was a proponent for free-markets, and so the food system changed quite dramatically during the 1980s. Companies were allowed to produce as much food as possible. Between 1980 and 2000, the calories in the food supply (per capita) increased from 3,200 to 4,000 calories. This presents a negative feedback loop. Since there is an increased number of calories in the food system, people are more likely to overconsume, which is seen as demand, and drives corporations to further produce cheap calorie dense foods.

In order to increase efficiency and cost effectiveness, agricultural policies have subsidized a narrow range of commodity crops like corn and soybeans because they can be used in a large variety of items, making them more profitable to subsidize than fruits and vegetables. Corn and soybeans are used to produce the most popular chips, snack bars, candies and drinks. This is an issue for people of lower-economic status' because they may rely on unhealthy calorie dense food to survive.

Individuals in lower income areas are dependent on food banks and because of that are not getting foods that are high in nutrients. Food insecure individuals, who live in low-income communities experience higher rates of chronic disease, leading to healthcare costs which create more financial hardships.

=== Early development ===
Children who experience hunger have an increase in both physical and psychological health problems. Hunger can lead to multiple health consequences, pre-birth development, low birth weights, higher frequency of illness and a delay in mental and physical development. This impairment may cause educational issues, which often can lead to children being held back a year in school.

Although there is not a direct correlation between chronic illnesses and hunger among children, the overall health and development of children decreases with exposure to hunger and food insecurity. Children are more likely to get ill and require a longer recovery period when they do not consume the necessary amount of nutrients. Additionally, children who consume a high amount of highly processed, packaged goods are more-likely to develop chronic diseases such as diabetes and cardiovascular disease due to these food items containing a high amount of calories in the form of added sugars and fats. Children experiencing hunger in the first three years of life are more likely to be hospitalized, experience higher rates of anemia and asthma and develop a weakened immune system, and develop chronic illnesses as an adult. Hunger in later stages of childhood can cause a delayed onset of puberty changing the rate of secretion of critically needed hormones.

=== Mental health and academic performance ===
In regards to academics, children who experience hunger perform worse in school on both mathematic and reading assessments. Children who consistently start the day with a nutritious breakfast have an average increase of 17.5% on their standardized math scores than children who regularly miss breakfast. Behavioral issues arise in both the school environment and in the children's ability to interact with peers of the same age. This is identified by both parental and teacher observations and assessments. Children are more likely to repeat a grade in elementary school and experience developmental impairments in areas like language and motor skills.

Hunger takes a psychological toll on youth and negatively affects their mental health. Their lack of food contributes to the development of emotional problems and causes children to have visited with a psychiatrist more often than their sufficiently fed peers. Research shows that hunger plays a role in late youth and young adult depression and suicidal ideation. It was identified as a factor in 5.6% of depression and suicidal ideation cases in a Canadian longitudinal study.

=== Senior health ===
Food insecurity has a negative impact on seniors' health and nutrition outcomes compared to food secure seniors. Research found that seniors experiencing hunger are more susceptible to physical health issues like high blood pressure, congestive heart failure, coronary heart disease, heart attack, asthma, and oral health issues.

=== Pregnancy ===
Food insecurity also has direct health consequences on pregnancy. Food insecurity during pregnancy is associated with gestational weight gain and pregnancy complications, second-trimester anemia, pregnancy-induced hypertension, and gestational diabetes mellitus (GDM), worse systolic blood pressure trends, increased risk of birth defects, and decreased breastfeeding.

== Geographic disparities ==
=== Rural and urban communities ===
There are distinct differences between how hunger is experienced in the rural and urban settings. Rural counties experience high food insecurity rates twice as often as urban counties. It has been reported that approximately 3 million rural households are food insecure, which is equal to 15 percent of the total population of rural households. This reflects the fact that 7.5 million people in rural regions live below the federal poverty line. This poverty in rural communities is more commonly found in Southern states. The prevalence of food insecurity is found to be highest in principal cities (13.2%), high in rural areas (12.7) and lowest in suburban and other metropolitan' areas (non-principal cities) (8.9%). This could possibly display the poor infrastructure within rural and downtown areas in cities, where jobs may be scarce, or display a central reliance on a mode of transit which may come at additional cost.

In addition, rural areas possess fewer grocery stores than urban regions with similar population density and geography. However, rural areas do have more supermarkets than similar urban areas. Research has discovered that rural counties' poverty level and racial composition do not have a direct, significant association to supermarket access in the area. Urban areas by contrast have shown through countless studies that an increase in the African American population correlates to fewer supermarkets and the ones available require residents to travel a longer distance. Despite these differences both city and rural areas experience a higher rate of hunger than suburban areas.

=== Food deserts ===
Food deserts are areas characterized by poor access to healthy and affordable food, [and] may contribute to social and spatial disparities in diet and diet-related health outcomes . Although there is not a national definition for food deserts, most measures take into account the following factors:

1. Accessibility to sources of healthy food, as measured by distance to a store or by the number of stores in an area.
2. Individual-level resources that may affect accessibility, such as family income or vehicle availability.
3. Neighborhood-level indicators of resources, such as the average income of the neighborhood and the availability of public transportation.

These measures look different across geographic regions. In rural areas, an area is named a food desert if access to a grocery story is over 10 miles away. According to Feeding America, rural communities make up 63% of counties in the United States and 87% of counties with the highest rates of overall food insecurity. However, according to a study by USDA, areas with higher poverty rates are more likely to be food deserts regardless if rural or urban.

According to the USDA, in 2015, about 19 million people, around 6% of the United States population, lived in a food desert, and 2.1 million households both lived in a food desert and lacked access to a vehicle. However, the definition and number of people living in food deserts is constantly evolving as it depends on census information.

Food Mirage

Another aspect of food insecurity are food mirages. A food mirage is an area that has an abundance of healthy grocery stores; however, prices are too high for low-income individuals and families to afford. This can lead to hunger due to the inaccessibility of affordable foods and food insecurity going under the radar. Gentrification of neighborhoods exacerbates the issue of food deserts.

=== Regions and states ===
Regionally, the food insecurity rate is highest in the South (12.0 percent).

States experience different rates of food insecurity, at varying levels of severity. Food insecurity is highest in Alabama, Arkansas, Indiana, Kentucky, Louisiana, Mississippi, North Carolina, New Mexico, Ohio, Oklahoma, Texas, and West Virginia.

== Demographics ==
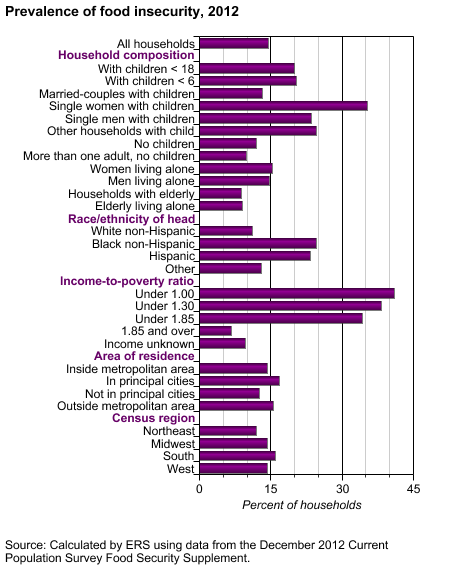
Food insecurity by household in America, 2012

Research by the USDA found that 11.1% of American households were food insecure during at least some of 2018, with 4.3% suffering from "very low food security". Breaking that down to 14.3 million households that experienced food insecurity. Estimating that 37.2 million people living in food-insecure households, and experienced food insecurity in 2018. Of these 37.2 million people approximately six million children were living in food insecure households and around a half million children experience very low food security. Low food insecurity is defined as demonstrating modified eating norms due to financial struggles in ascertaining food.

A survey took for Brookings in late April 2020 found indications that following the COVID-19 pandemic, the number of US households experiencing food insecurity had approximately doubled. For households with young children, indicators had suggested food insecurity may have reached about 40%, close to four times the prevalence in 2018, or triple what was seen for the previous peak that occurred in 2008, during the Great Recession. (See more at COVID-19 pandemic in the United States)

Food insecurity issues disproportionately affect people in Black and Hispanic communities, low-income household, single women households, and immigrant communities.

=== Children ===
In 2011 16.7 million children lived in food-insecure households, about 35% more than 2007 levels, though only 1.1% of U.S. children, 845,000, saw reduced food intake or disrupted eating patterns at some point during the year, and most cases were not chronic.

Almost 16 million children lived in food-insecure households in 2012. Schools throughout the country had 21 million children participate in a free or reduced lunch program and 11 million children participate in a free or reduced breakfast program. The extent of American youth facing hunger is clearly shown through the fact that 47% of SNAP (Supplemental Nutrition Assistance Program) participants are under the age of 18. The states with the lowest rate of food insecure children were North Dakota, Minnesota, Virginia, New Hampshire, and Massachusetts as of 2012.

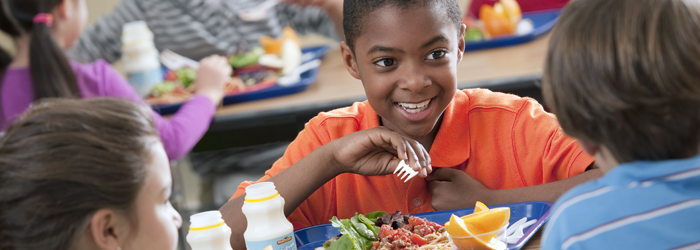
The National School Lunch Program (NSLP) was established under the National School Lunch Act, signed by President Harry Truman in 1946.

In 2018 six million children experience food insecurity. Feeding America estimates that around one in seven children or approximately 11 million, children experience hunger and do not know where they will get their next meal or when. The wide breadth between these source's data could possibly be explain that food insecurity is not all-encompassing of hunger, and is only a solid predictor. 13.9% of households with children experience food insecurity with the number increasing for households having children under the age of six (14.3%).

=== College students ===
A growing body of literature suggests that food insecurity is an emerging concern in college students. Food insecurity prevalence was found to be 43.5% in a systematic review of food insecurity among US students in higher education. This prevalence of food insecurity is over twice as high as that reported in United States national households. Data have been collected to estimate prevalence both nationally as well as at specific institutions (two and four year colleges). For example, an Oregon university reported that 59% of their college students experienced food insecurity where as in a correlational study conducted at the University of Hawaii at Manoa found that 21–24% of their undergraduate students were food-insecure or at risk of food insecurity. Data from a large southwestern university show that 32% of college freshmen, who lived in residence halls, self-reported inconsistent access to food in the past month. According to a 2011 survey of the City University of New York (CUNY) undergraduates, about two in five students reported being food insecure.

=== Elderly ===
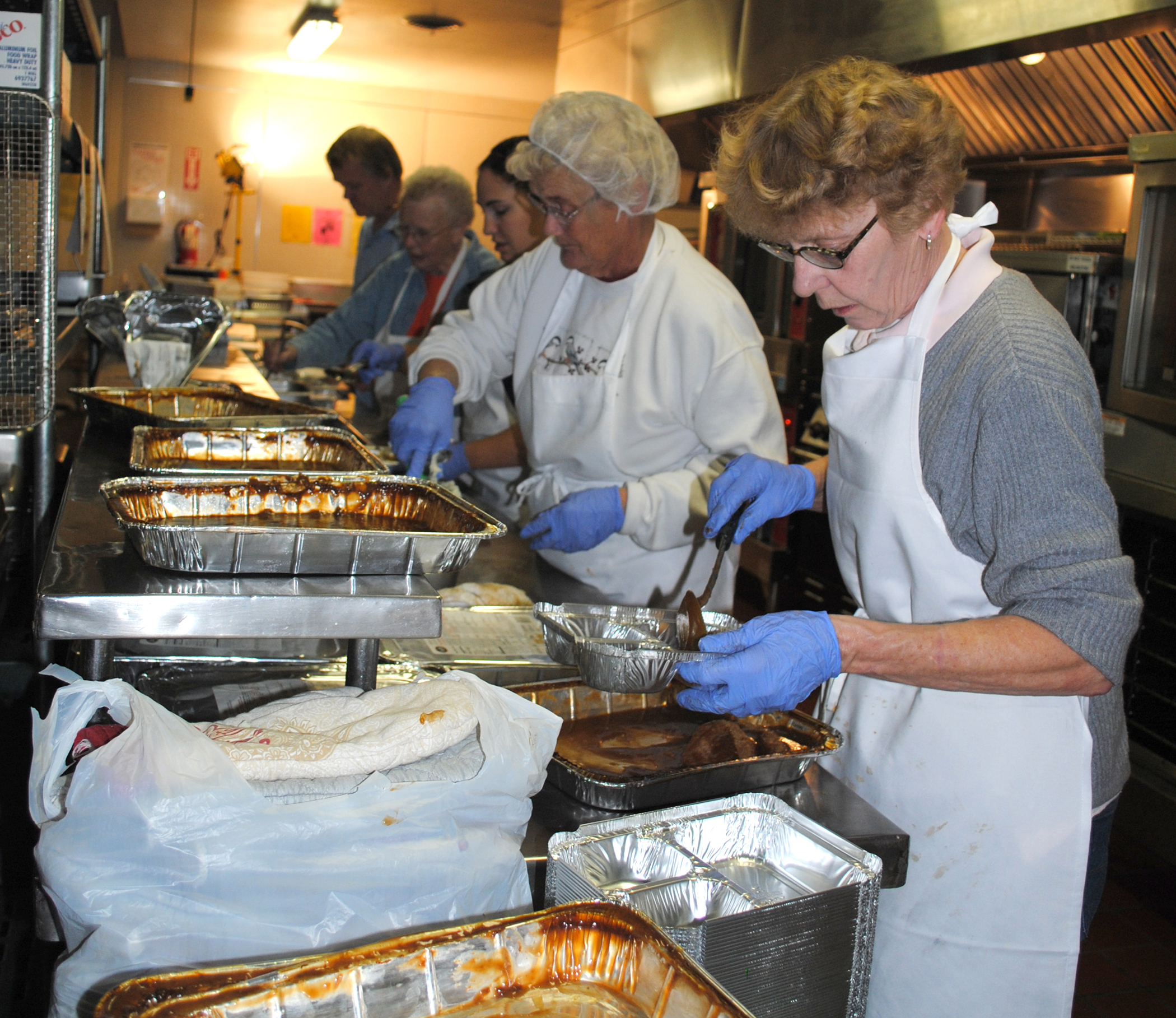
Volunteers preparing meals for Meals on Wheels recipients

Like children, the elderly population of the United States are vulnerable to the negative consequences of hunger. In 2011, there was an increase of 0.9% in the number of seniors facing the threat of hunger from 2009. This resulted in a population of 8.8 million seniors who are facing this threat; however, a total of 1.9 million seniors were dealing with hunger at this time. Seniors are particularly vulnerable to hunger and food insecurity largely due to their limited mobility. They are less likely to own a car and drive, and when they live in communities that lack public transportation, it can be quite challenging to access adequate food.

Approximately 5.5 million senior citizens face hunger in the United States. This number has been steadily increasing since 2001 by 45%. Predictions believe that more than 8 million senior citizens will be suffering by 2050. Senior citizens are at an increased risk of food insecurity with many having fixed incomes and having to choose between health care and food. With most eligible seniors failing to enroll and receive food assistance such as SNAP. The organization Meals on Wheels reports that Mississippi, New Mexico, Arkansas, and Texas are the states with the top rates of seniors facing the threat of hunger respectively. Due to food insecurity and hunger, the elderly population experiences negative effects on their overall health and mental wellbeing. Not only are they more prone to reporting heart attacks, other cardiac conditions, and asthma, but food insecure seniors are also 60% more likely to develop depression.

=== Gender ===
Female single headed household experience food insecurity at a higher rates than the national average. For households without children, 14.2% of female single-headed households experience food insecurity compares to 12.5% in male single-headed households. For households with children, 27.8% of female single-headed household experience hunger compares to 15.9% of male single-headed household.

=== Race and ethnicity ===
Minority groups are affected by hunger to far greater extent than the Caucasian population in the United States. According to research conducted by Washington University in St. Louis on food insufficiency by race, 11.5% of Whites experience food insufficiency compared to 22.98% of African Americans, 16.67% of American Indians, and 26.66% of Hispanics when comparing each racial sample group.

Feeding America reports that 29% of all Hispanic children and 38% of all African American children received emergency food assistance in 2010. White children received more than half the amount of emergency food assistance with 11% receiving aid. However, Hispanic households are less likely to have interaction with SNAP than other ethnic groups and received assistance from the program.

==== Ethnic Minorities ====
Food insecurity can disproportionately affect certain people such as ethnic minorities. According to a 2017 study on the interactions between race and food security, Black and Latino people experience 12.7% higher food insecurity rates and a USDA 2015 study reports food insecurity rates that are 2.5 times higher than White people. In 2018, non-Hispanic black people experienced almost three times the level of severe food insecurity that non-Hispanic White people did. Immigrants are another group more likely to face food security challenges. Studies conducted in California, Illinois, Texas, Los Angeles, Oregon, and Iowa have shown elevated rates of food insecurity among immigrant families and individuals. 50% of Latino immigrant families in California, and 40% of Cambodian, and Vietnamese immigrant families in California, Illinois, and Texas report levels of food insecurity.

Minority groups are more likely to face socioeconomic obstacles than non-minority people contributing to higher levels of food insecurity. For one, poverty is a major contributor to insecurity and since poverty disproportionately affects Black and Latino people in America, they are at a higher risk. When looking at gender as another variable, Black women have the highest rates of poverty among all racial groups contributing to higher rates of insecurity.

==== Black ====
In the same survey during 2018 it displays a racial disparity between hunger, and food insecurity. For Blacks 21.2% experience food insecurity. This becomes alarming when comparing poverty rates for Blacks to Whites with data displaying the highest groups to experience food insecurity are those that experience the most severe poverty (9% of which African-Americans live in deep poverty conditions). In continuation and for further support "The 10 counties with the highest food insecurity rates in the nation are at least 60% African-American. Seven of the ten counties are in Mississippi". This depicts the intersectionality of socio-economic and race to display the greatest food insecurity.

==== Hispanic/Latino ====
Hispanic/Latino populations also experience inequitably high rates of food insecurity in the United States. In 2020, amidst the global COVID-19 pandemic, 19% of all Latinos in America were designated as food insecure. In the United States, Hispanic/Latino families experience nearly twice the rate of food insecurity as non-Hispanic/Latino white families, and repeatedly research shows higher risk of food insecurity in immigrant families and children of non-citizens.

According to Feeding America, this phenomenon is connected to the following:

- "Racial prejudice and language, education, and cultural barriers create inequalities that make Latino communities more vulnerable to food insecurity.
- Due to the coronavirus pandemic, food insecurity among Latinos rose from almost 16% in 2019 to more than 19% in 2020. Latinos were 2.5 times more likely to experience food insecurity than white individuals.
- Latino workers, especially Latinas, are more likely to be employed in the leisure and hospitality industries that have been devastated by the coronavirus pandemic. Workers in these industries continue to face the highest unemployment rate.
- According to the Census, Latinos make up 28% of the people living in poverty in the United States. However, Latinos make up only 19% of the total population of the United States."

Another study, published in 2019 by the Journal of Adolescent Health, found that 42% of Hispanic/Latino youth experienced food insecurity; additionally, 10% lived in a very low food secure household. Food insecurity in Hispanic/Latino youth has severe health consequences, including acculturative and economic stress and weakened family support systems.

=== Native American ===
While research into Native American food security has gone unnoticed and under researched until recent years, more studies are being conducted which reveal that Native Americans oftentimes experience higher rates of food insecurity than any other racial group in the United States. The studies do not focus on the overall picture of Native American households, however, and tend to focus rather on smaller sample sizes in the available research. In a study that evaluated the level of food insecurity among White, Asian, Black, Hispanic and Indigenous Americans: it was reported that over a 10-year span of 2000–2010, Indigenous people were reported to be one of the highest at-risk groups of from a lack of access to adequate food, reporting anywhere from 20%-30% of households suffering from this type of insecurity. There are many reasons that contribute to the issue, but overall, the biggest lie in high food costs on or near reservations, lack of access to well-paying jobs, and predisposition to health issues relating to obesity and/or mental health.

=== Undocumented immigrants ===
Agriculture is a major industry in the United States, with California accounting for over 12% of the U.S. agriculture cash receipts. Over half of agricultural workers in California are undocumented. Agricultural labor is among the lowest paid occupations in the U.S. Many undocumented immigrants suffer from food insecurity due to low wages, forcing them to purchase economically viable unhealthy food. Though existing food pantry and food stamp programs aid in reducing the amount of food insecure individuals, undocumented immigrants are ineligible for social service programs and studies have found that limited English acts as a barrier to food stamp program participation. Due to a lack of education, higher incarceration rate, and language barriers, undocumented immigrants pose higher rates of food insecurity and hunger when compared to legal citizens. Undocumented immigrants who fear being deported limit their interactions with government agencies and social service programs, increasing their susceptibility to food insecurity.

Food insecurity among undocumented immigrants can in some cases be traced to environmental injustices. Researchers argue that climate change increases food insecurity due to drought or floods and that issues of food security and the food systems of the U.S. must be addressed. An example may be large populations of undocumented communities along the Central Valley of California. Towns located across the Central Valley of CA exhibit some of the highest rates of air, water and pesticide pollution in the state.

=== Sexual minorities ===
Food insecurity is also shown to disproportionately affect Black women and people who identify as a sexual minority, a factor contributing to the intersectionality of food insecurity as an issue. Sexual minorities are more likely to experience food insecurity when compared to heterosexuals and an analysis of different intersectional variables like gender show that women who identify as non-heterosexual, report higher rates of insecurity compared to non-heterosexual men. Sexual minorities may also face challenges in isolation of their gender; Non-heterosexual women were 50-84% more likely to experience severe food insecurity than heterosexual women.

Transgender people are also at an elevated risk for food insecurity compared to cisgender people. In the United States of America alone, around 1.5 million people identify as transgender. Instances of mental illness as well as disadvantageous conditions like unemployment, disability, homelessness, and poverty are higher among transgender people, particularly transgender women. These disadvantages could contribute to food insecurity among transgender people as Myers and Painter II (2017) note that unemployment, access to healthcare, participation in government programs such as the Supplemental Nutrition Assistance Program, and status as a disabled person are some, but not all, factors that affect access to adequate nutrition and food security as a whole.

== Coronavirus (COVID-19) pandemic and food insecurity ==
=== Unemployment ===
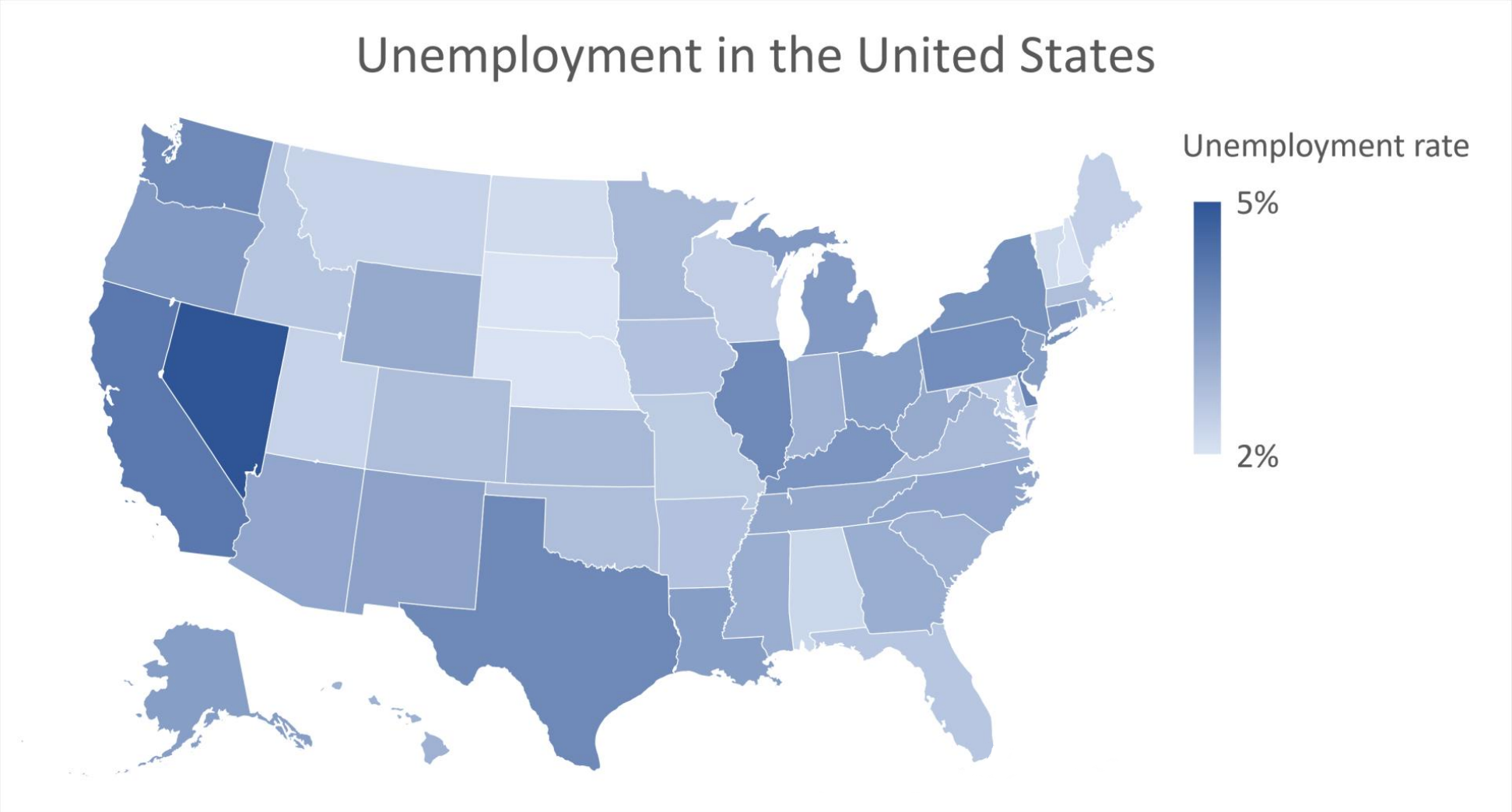
Unemployment in the United States (June 2023)

Recent studies suggest that food insecurity in the United States has doubled overall and tripled among households with children since the start of the COVID-19 pandemic. Food security rates can be predicated by the national unemployment rate because food insecurity is measured by both access to food and ability to afford it. During economic downturns in the past several centuries, food insecurity and food shortages rise not only during the year of the downturn, but for several years after.

In 2020, the COVID-19 pandemic and economic volatility have spurred mass layoffs or hour reductions, specifically in the transportation, service, leisure, and hospitality industries and domestic workers. As a result of lost wages, individuals and families working in these industries are increasingly more likely to be food and housing insecure.

=== Racial and gender disparities ===
Unemployment and food insecurity, linked to the COVID-19 pandemic, have disproportionately affected people of color and communities. People of color are employed in many industries susceptible to layoffs, and as a result of the pandemic, workers are experiencing high levels of unemployment. Persons of color are more likely to work 'essential' jobs, such as grocery store clerks, or in healthcare, thus they are at a higher risk of exposure for contracting the virus, which could lead to loss of hourly wages. According to the U.S. Census Bureau Household Pulse Survey, "among adults living in households where someone experienced losses in employment income, 36% of adults in households with an income of less than $25,000 reported either 'sometimes not having enough to eat' or 'often not having enough to eat' in the past week, compared with just 2.1% of adults in households with an income of $100,000 or more."

Women in particular, have been more vulnerable than men to job loss as a result of the COVID-19 pandemic. Women, especially minority women, are overrepresented in education, healthcare, and hospitality industries. According to the National Women's Law Center, Before the pandemic, "women held 77% of the jobs in education and health services, but they account for 83% of the jobs lost in those sectors." According to the United States Department of Agriculture in 2015, over 30% of households with children headed by a single mother were food insecure, and this number is expected to rise as a result of any economic downturn.

=== Children and school meal programs ===
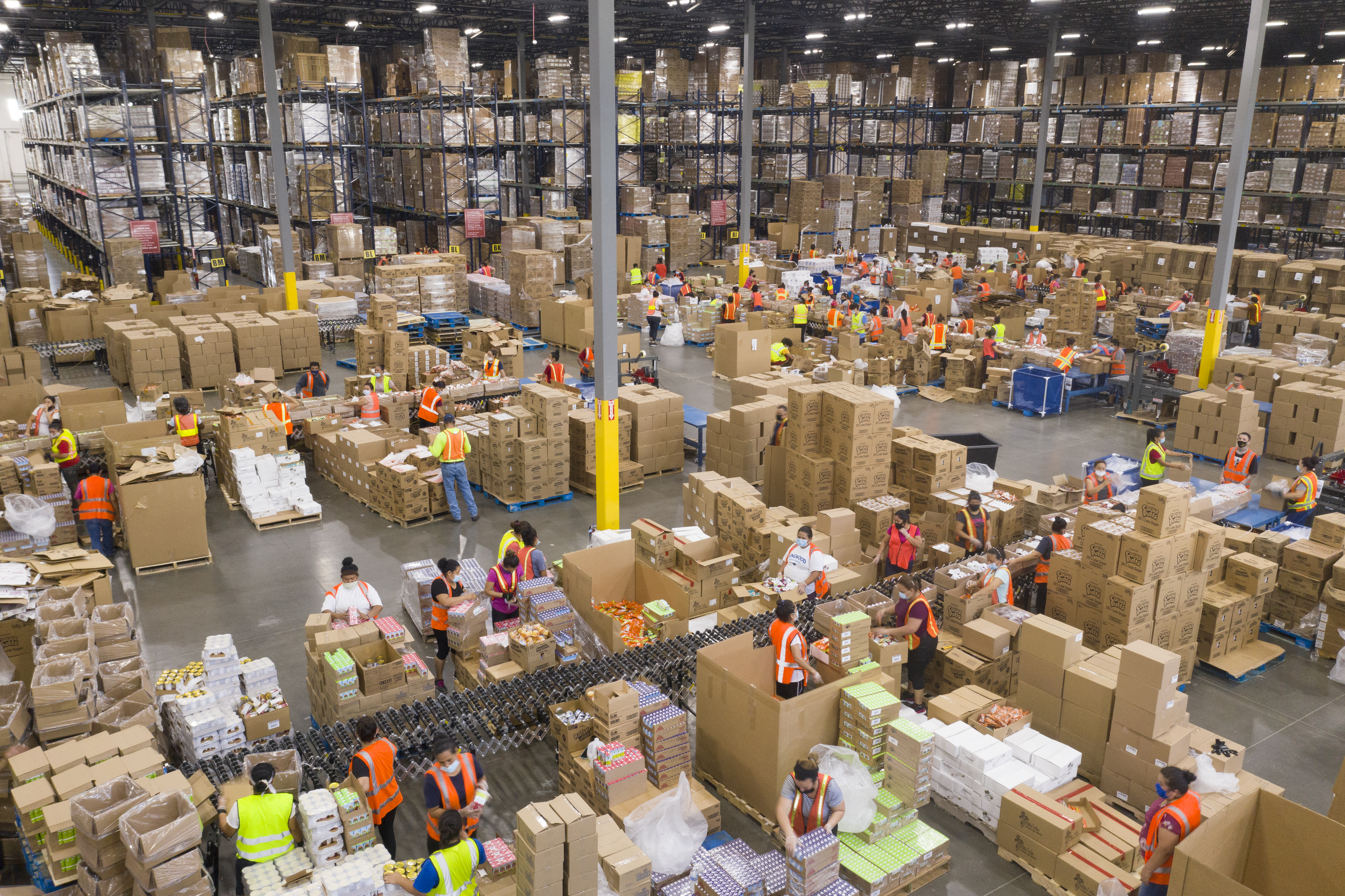
The U.S. Department of Agriculture sets up a food packing facility to send food to rural students effected by the COVID-19 school closures.

The Brookings Institution found that the United States experienced a 65% increase in food insecurity among households with children. For example, in the third week of June in 2020, approximately 13.9 million children were living in a food insecurity, which is 5.6 times as many as in all of 2018 (2.5 million) and 2.7 times then the peak of the Great Recession in 2008 (5.1 million).

According to No Kid Hungry and The Hunger Partnership, more than 22 million kids get a free or reduced-price school lunch on an average school day. Schools closures and transitions to remote learning across the country due to the pandemic causes many schools to take on their summer plan for food distribution, requiring families to pick up food at specific times of the day in neighborhoods with the greatest need. However, many children who qualify for these programs are not receiving meals because often because parents and caretakers cannot pick up meals at the designated times as they have returned to work or lack transportation.

== Fighting hunger ==
=== Public sector hunger relief ===
As of 2012, the United States government spent about $50 billion annually on 10 programs, mostly administrated by the Center for Nutrition Policy and Promotion, which in total deliver food assistance to one in five Americans.

The largest and only universal program is the Supplemental Nutrition Assistance Program, formerly known as the food stamp program. In the 2012 fiscal year, $74.6 billion in food assistance was distributed. As of December 2012, 47.8 million Americans were receiving on average $133.73 per month in food assistance.

Despite efforts to increase uptake, an estimated 15 million eligible Americans are still not using the program. Historically, about 40 million Americans were using the program in 2010, while in 2001, 18 million were claiming food stamps. After cut backs to welfare in the early 1980s and late 1990s, private sector aid had begun to overtake public aid such as food stamps as the fastest growing form of food assistance, although the public sector provided much more aid in terms of volume.

This changed in the early 21st century; the public sector's rate of increase in the amount of food aid dispensed again overtook the private sector's. President George W. Bush's administration undertook bipartisan efforts to increase the reach of the food stamp program, increasing its budget and reducing both the stigma associated with applying for aid and barriers imposed by red tape. Cuts in the food stamp programme came into force in November 2013, impacting an estimated 48 million poorer Americans, including 22 million children.

Most other programs are targeted at particular types of citizen. The largest of these is the School Lunch program, which in 2010 helped feed 32 million children a day. The second largest is the School Breakfast Program, feeding 16 million children in 2010. The next largest is the Special Supplemental Nutrition Program for Women, Infants and Children, which provide food aid for about 9 million women and children in 2010.

A program that is neither universal nor targeted is Emergency Food Assistance Program. This is a successor to the Federal Surplus Relief Corporation which used to distribute surplus farm production direct to poor people; now the program works in partnership with the private sector, by delivering the surplus produce to food banks and other civil society agencies.

In 2010, the Obama administration initiated the Healthy Food Financing Initiative (HFFI) as a means of expanding access to healthy foods in low-income communities. With over $400 million in funding from the Department of Health and Human Services, the Department of Agriculture and the Treasury Department, the initiative promoted interventions such as equipping already existing grocery stores and small retailers with more nutritious food options and investing in the development of new healthful food retailers in rural and urban food deserts.

Countless partnerships have emerged in the quest for food security. A number of federal nutrition programs exist to provide food specifically for children, including the Summer Food Service Program, Special Milk Program (SMP) and Child and Adult Care Food Program (CACFP), and community and state organizations often network with these programs. Children whose families qualify for Supplemental Nutrition Assistance Program (SNAP) or Women, Infants, and Children (WIC) may also receive food assistance. WIC alone served approximately 7.6 million participants, 75% of which are children and infants.

Despite the sizable populations served by these programs, Conservatives have regularly targeted these programs for defunding. Conservatives' arguments against school nutrition programs include fear of wasting food and fraud from applications.

In March 2025, the United States Department of Agriculture has canceled the Local Food Purchase Assistance Cooperative Agreement Program that gave food banks and other feeding organizations money to buy food, yet unfreezing funds for existing LFPA agreements, but plans to cancel a second round of funding for fiscal year 2025, about $420 million.

==== Child nutrition programs at schools ====
According to a 2015 Congressional Budget Office report on child nutrition programs, it is more likely that food-insecure children will participate in school nutrition programs than children from food-secure families. School nutrition programs, such as the National School Lunch Program (NSLP) and the School Breakfast Program (SBP) have provided millions of children access to healthier lunch and breakfast meals, since their inception in the mid-1900s. According to the Centers for Disease Control and Prevention, NSLP has served over 300 million, while SBP has served about 10 million students each day. Nevertheless, far too many qualifying students still fail to receive these benefits simply due to not submitting the necessary paperwork.

Multiple studies have reported that school nutrition programs play an important role in ensuring students are accessing healthy meals. Students who ate school lunches provided by NLSP showed higher diet quality than if they had their lunches. Even more, the USDA improved standards for school meals, which ultimately led to positive impacts on children's food selection and eating habits.

In March 2025, the United States Department of Agriculture has canceled the Local Food for Schools Cooperative Agreement Program that gave schools about $660 million to buy food from local farms and ranchers.

==== Agricultural policy ====
Another potential approach to mitigating hunger and food insecurity is modifying agricultural policy. The implementation of policies that reduce the subsidization of crops such as corn and soybeans and increase subsidies for the production of fresh fruits and vegetables would effectively provide low-income populations with greater access to affordable and healthy foods. This method is limited by the fact that the prices of animal-based products, oils, sugar, and related food items have dramatically decreased on the global scale in the past twenty to fifty years. According to the Nutritional Review Journal, a reduction or removal of subsidies for the production of these foods will not appreciably change their lower cost in comparison to healthier options such as fruits and vegetables.

Current agricultural policy favors monocultures and large corporate farming. These are usually not in favor of community food needs. An alternative agricultural policy would turn toward more diversity in crops and allow communities to more locally define their own agricultural and food system policies that are socially, economically, ecologically, and culturally appropriate. This is food sovereignty.

==== Supermarket construction ====
Local and state governments can also work to pass legislation that calls for the establishment of healthy food retailers in low-income neighborhoods classified as food deserts. The implementation of such policies can reduce hunger and food insecurity by increasing the availability and variety of healthy food options and providing a convenient means of access. Examples of this are The Pennsylvania Fresh Food Financing Initiative and The New York City FRESH (Food Retail Expansion Health) program, which promote the construction of supermarkets in low-income neighborhoods by offering a reduction in land or building taxes for a certain period of time and providing grants, loans, and tax exemption for infrastructure costs. Such policies may be limited by the oligopolistic nature of supermarkets, in which a few large supermarket chains maintain the large majority of market share and exercise considerable influence over retail locations and prices.

==== Transportation infrastructure ====
If it is unfeasible to implement policies aimed at grocery store construction in low-income neighborhoods, local and state governments can instead invest in transportation infrastructure. This would provide residents of low-income neighborhoods with greater access to healthy food options at more remote supermarkets. This strategy may be limited by the fact that low-income populations often face time constraints in managing employment and caring for children and may not have the time to commute to buy healthy foods. Furthermore, this method does not address the issue of neighborhood deprivation, failing to resolve the disparities in access to goods and services across geographical space.

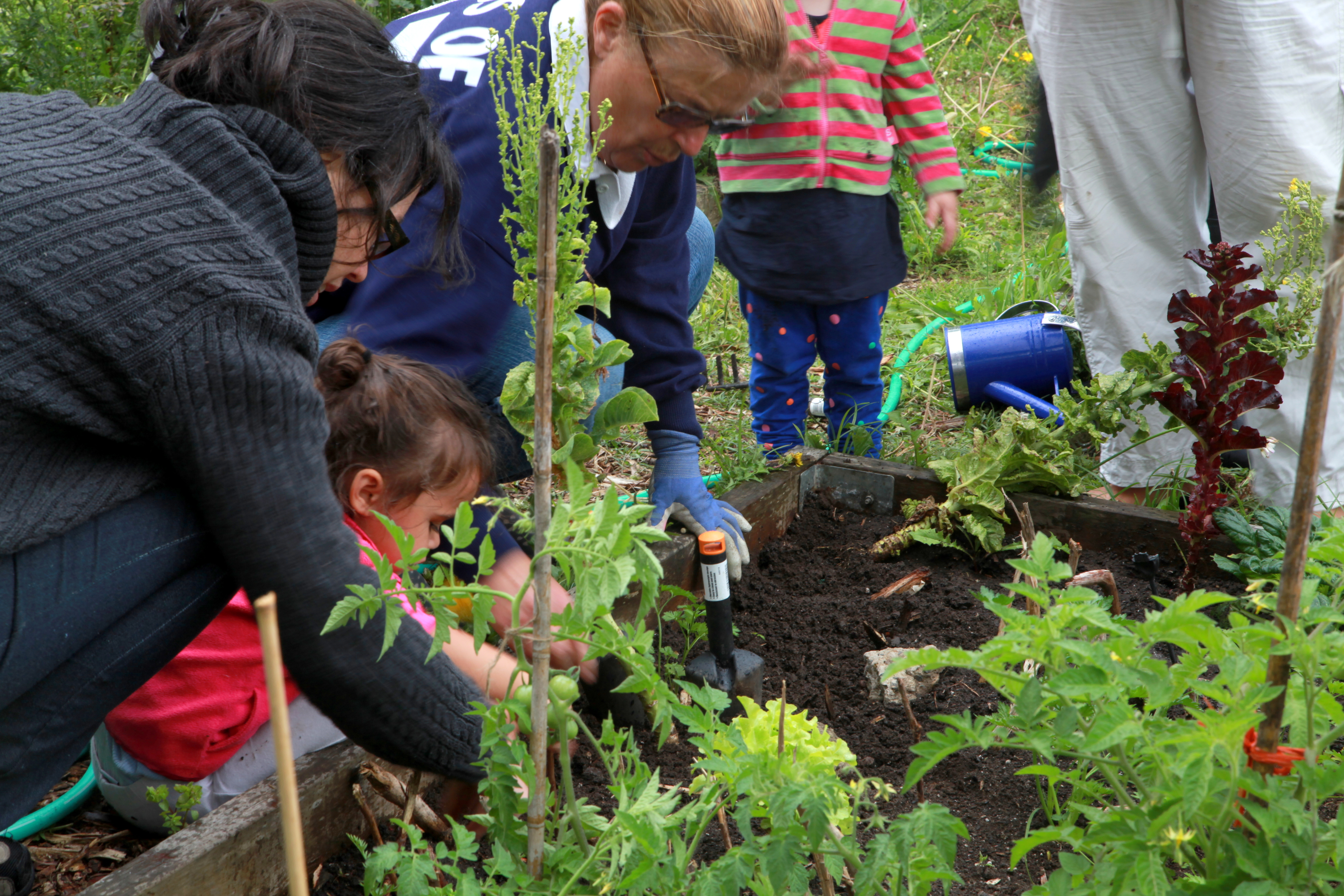
A small group of people planting fruits or vegetables in a communal garden

==== Community gardens ====
Local governments can also mitigate hunger and food insecurity in low-income neighborhoods by establishing community gardens. According to the Encyclopedia of Community, a community garden is "an organized, grassroots initiative whereby a section of land is used to produce food or flowers or both in an urban environment for the personal use or collective benefit of its members." Community gardens are beneficial in that they provide community members with self-reliant methods for acquiring nutritious, affordable food. This contrasts with safety net programs, which may alleviate food insecurity but often foster dependency.

According to the Journal of Applied Geography, community gardens are most successful when they are developed using a bottom-up approach, in which community members are actively engaged from the start of the planning process. This empowers community members by allowing them to take complete ownership over the garden and make decisions about the food they grow. Community gardens are also beneficial because they allow community members to develop a better understanding of the food system, the gardening process, and healthy versus unhealthy foods. Community gardens thereby promote better consumption choices and allow community members to maintain healthier lifestyles.

Despite the many advantages of community gardens, community members may face challenges in regard to accessing and securing land, establishing organization and ownership of the garden, maintaining sufficient resources for gardening activities, and preserving safe soils.

=== Private sector hunger relief ===
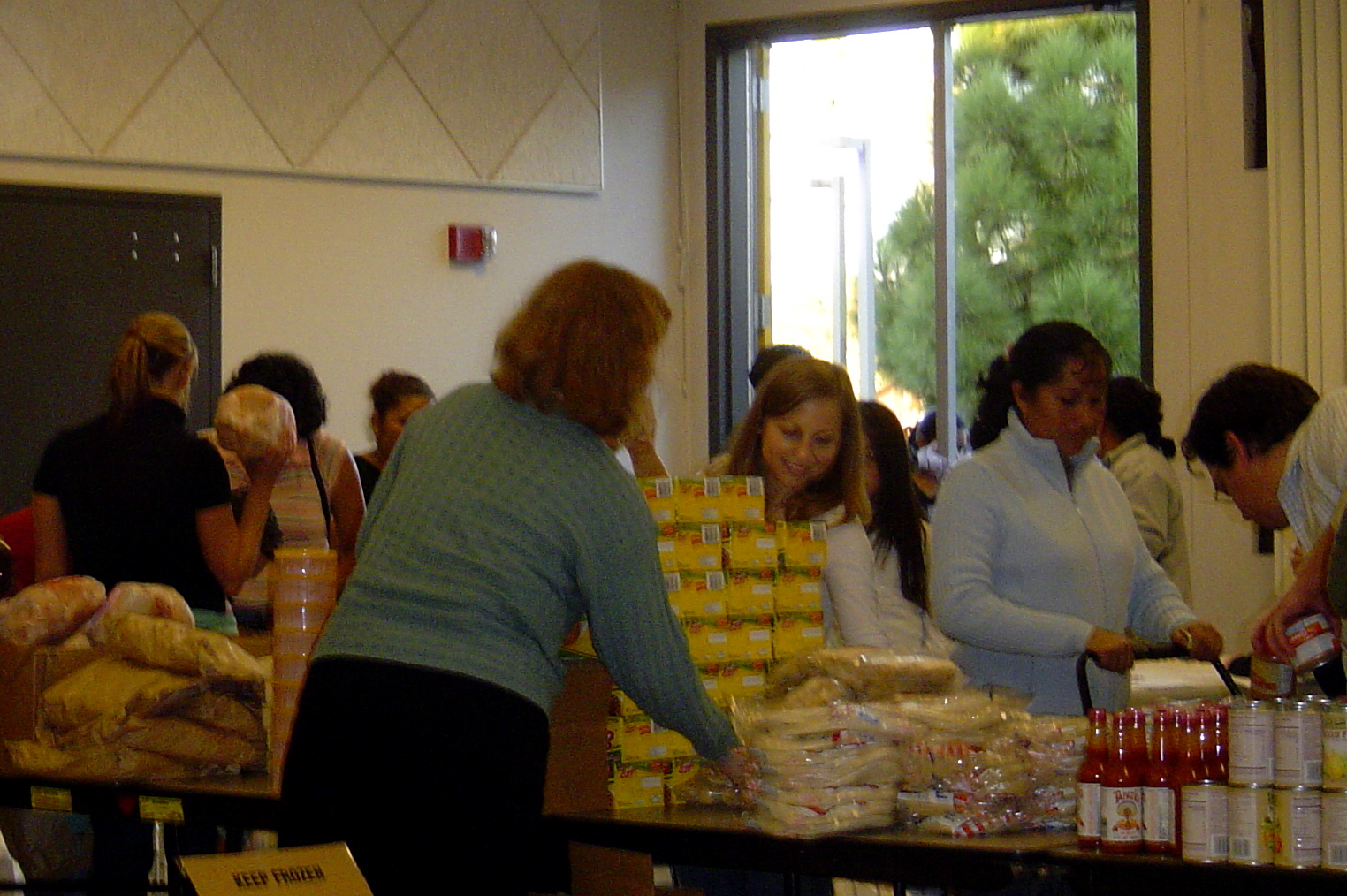
Volunteers pass out food items from a Feeding America food bank.

The oldest type of formal hunger relief establishment used in the United States is believed to be the almshouse, but these are no longer in existence. A couple decades after WWII a notion was spread that hunger had been alleviated in Western countries. One man in the U.S., John van Hengel, was frustrated with the little attention towards food insecurity after hearing a woman tell her story of food insecurity when she walked into the soup kitchen where he was volunteering. In 1967 established the first food bank in Phoenix, Arizon~~a~~ named St. Mary's food bank alliance. It worked by collecting food that has been thrown away by grocery stores because it was no longer salable but was good regardless for human consumption. Around the same time, from 1969 through the 1980s, the renowned Black Panther party established a very effective free breakfast program. Launched in January 1969, Bobby Seale started this program at Father Earl A. Neil's St.Augustine episcopal church in West Oakland. In the 21st century, hunger relief agencies run by civil society include:

- Soup kitchens, along with similar establishments like food kitchens and meal centers, provide hot meals for the hungry and are the second most common type of food aid agency in the U.S. Unlike food pantry, these establishments usually provide only a single meal per visit, but they have the advantage for the end user of generally providing food with no questions asked.
- Within the United States, food pantries are the most numerous among the food aid establishments. The food pantry hands out packages of groceries to the hungry. Unlike soup kitchens, they invariably give out enough food for several meals, which is to be consumed off the premises. A related establishment is the food closet, which serves a similar purpose to the food pantry, but will never be a dedicated building. Instead, a food closet will be a room within a larger building like a church or community center. Food closets can be found in rural communities too small to support a food pantry. Food pantries often have procedures to prevent unscrupulous people from taking advantage of them, such as requiring registration. Unlike soup kitchens, food pantry relief helps people make it from one paycheck to another when their funds run low.
- Food banks are the third most common type of food aid agency. While some food banks give food to the hungry, generally, US food banks function like a warehouse, distributing food to front line agencies like food pantries and soup kitchens.
- Food rescue organizations also perform a warehouse like function, distributing food to front line organizations, though they are less common and tend to operate on a smaller scale than do food banks. Whereas food banks may receive supplies from large growers, manufacturers, supermarkets, and the federal government, rescue organizations typically retrieve food from sources such as restaurants along with smaller shops and farms.

Together, these civil society food assistance establishments are sometimes called the "Emergency Food Assistance System" (EFAS). In 2010, an estimated 37 million Americans received food from the EFAS. However, the amount of aid it supplies is much less than the public sector, with an estimate made in 2000 suggesting that the EFAS is able to give out only about $9.5 worth of food per person per month. According to a comprehensive government survey completed in 2002, about 80% of emergency kitchens and food pantries, over 90% of food banks, and all known food rescue organizations were established in the US after 1981, with much of the growth occurring after 1991.

There are several federal laws in the United States that promote food donation. The Bill Emerson Good Samaritan Food Donation Act encourages individuals to donate food to certain qualified nonprofit organizations and ensures liability protection to donors. Similarly, Internal Revenue Code 170(e)(3) grants tax deductions to businesses in order to encourage them to donate healthy food items to nonprofit organizations that serve low-income populations. Lastly, the U.S. Federal Food Donation Act of 2008 encourages Federal agencies and Federal agency contractors to donate healthy food items to non-profit organizations for redistribution to food insecure individuals. Such policies curb food waste by redirecting nutritious food items to individuals in need.

These policies have also created debate over whether it is sustainable to rely on surplus food for food aid. While some view this as a "win-win" solution as it feeds people while reducing food waste, others argue that it prevents either issue of food waste and food insecurity from being systematically addressed from the root issue. It has also been found that there is commonly a stigma around people who rely on donations to feed themselves. Individuals are unable to shop for food in grocery stores, they are told that surplus food is an acceptable way for their need to be addressed, not all of their nutritional needs may be met, there is not always consist amounts and variation of food available to those in need, and it takes away from a solution that would fully address people's right to food.

=== Limitations and advocacy role of food banks ===
Despite their national, widespread presence, food banks face inherent limitations in addressing hunger's root causes, with a 2024 qualitative study finding that practitioners "overwhelmingly understand food banks and charity will not solve the issue of hunger in America."

This recognition has led some food banks to expand beyond service delivery into other sectors such as policy advocacy, leveraging their institutional power to advocate for rights-based approaches to food access. However, critics note that reliance of donated surplus and volunteer labor creates unstable assistance, that of which cannot guarantee consistent access to nutritious food, unlike rights-based entitlements with legal protections and quality standards.

=== Food Justice ===
Food Justice is a social movement approach to combating hunger. Food Justice seeks to provide greater food access to all communities through the creation of local food systems, such as urban agriculture and farmers markets. Locally based food networks move away from the globalized economy to provide food solutions and needs appropriate to the communities they serve. The Food Justice Movement specifically aims to address to disproportionate levels of food insecurity facing communities of color. Organizations in the movement often aim to reduce the high prevalence of food deserts and lack of nutritious foods seen in neighborhoods of color.

Race and class play significant roles in the location of food deserts and high food insecurity. Historically, communities of color have been subject to policies and laws that reduce their ability to be self-sufficient in food production. Community members past and present work as farm laborers while their own communities do not have power or access in their own food systems. As a result, communities of color are susceptible to economic segregation, and healthy food is more likely to be more expensive than in wealthier areas. Because of this history of inequality, there are growing projects to promote and enable low-income and people of color to create sustainable food systems.

== History ==
=== Pre-19th century ===
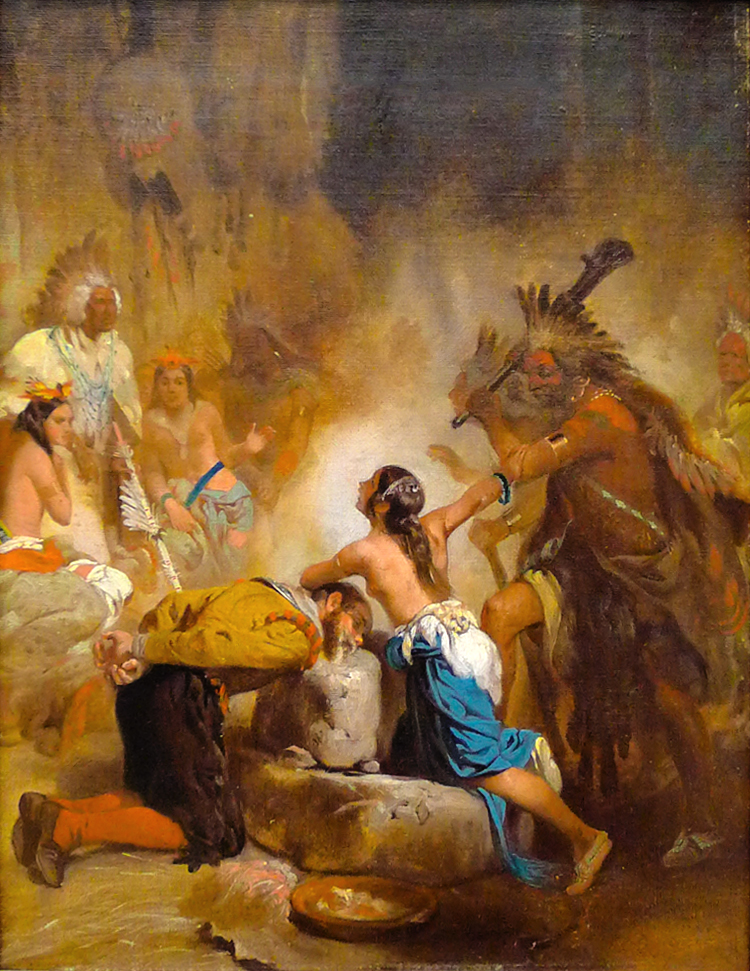
Early settlers to North America often suffered from hunger, though some were saved from starvation thanks to aid from Native Americans such as Pocahontas.

European colonists attempting to settle in North America during the 16th and early 17th century often faced severe hunger. Compared with South America, readily available food could be hard to come by. Many settlers starved to death, leading to several colonies being abandoned. Other settlers were saved after being supplied with food by Native Americans, with the intercession of Pocahontas being a famous example. It did not take long however for colonists to adapt to conditions in the new world, discovering North America to be a place of extraordinary fertility. According to author Peter K. Eisinger, the historian Robert Beverley's portrayal of America as the "Garden of the World" was already a stock image as early as 1705.

By the time of the Declaration of Independence in 1776, hunger was already considerably less severe than in Western Europe. Even by 1750, low prevalence of hunger had helped provide American Colonists with an estimated life expectancy of 51 years, while in Britain the figure was 37, in France 26; by 1800, life expectancies had improved to 56 years for the U.S., 33 years for France and dropped to 36 years for Britain. The relative scarcity of hunger in the U.S. was due in part to low population pressure in relation to fertile land, and as labor shortages prevented any able-bodied person from suffering from extreme poverty associated with unemployment.

=== 19th century ===
Until the early 19th century, even the poorest citizens of the United States were generally protected from hunger by a combination of factors. The ratio of productive land to population was high. Upper class Americans often still held to the old European ideal of Noblesse oblige and made sure their workers had sufficient food. Labor shortages meant the poor could invariably find a position—although until the American Revolution this often involved indentured servitude, this at least protected the poor from the unpredictable nature of wage labor, and sometimes paupers were rewarded with their own plot of land at the end of their period of servitude. Additionally, working class traditions of looking out for each other were strong.

Social and economic conditions changed substantially in the early 19th century, especially with the market reforms of the 1830s. While overall prosperity increased, productive land became harder to come by, and was often only available for those who could afford substantial rates. It became more difficult to make a living either from public lands or a small farm without substantial capital to buy up to date technology. Sometimes small farmers were forced off their lands by economic pressure and became homeless. American society responded by opening up numerous almshouses, and some municipal officials began giving out small sums of cash to the poor. Such measures did not fully check the rise in hunger; by 1850, life expectancy in the US had dropped to 43 years, about the same as then prevailed in Western Europe.

The number of hungry and homeless people in the U.S. increased in the 1870s due to industrialization. Though economic developments were hugely beneficial overall, driving America's Gilded Age, they had a negative impact on some of the poorest citizens. As was the case in Europe, many influential Americans believed in classical liberalism and opposed federal intervention to help the hungry, as they thought it could encourage dependency and would disrupt the operation of the free market. The 1870s saw the AICP and the American branch of the Charity Organization Society successfully lobby to end the practice where city official would hand out small sums of cash to the poor. Despite this, there was no nationwide restrictions on private efforts to help the hungry, and civil society immediately began to provide alternative aid for the poor, establishing soup kitchens in U.S. cities.

=== 20th century ===
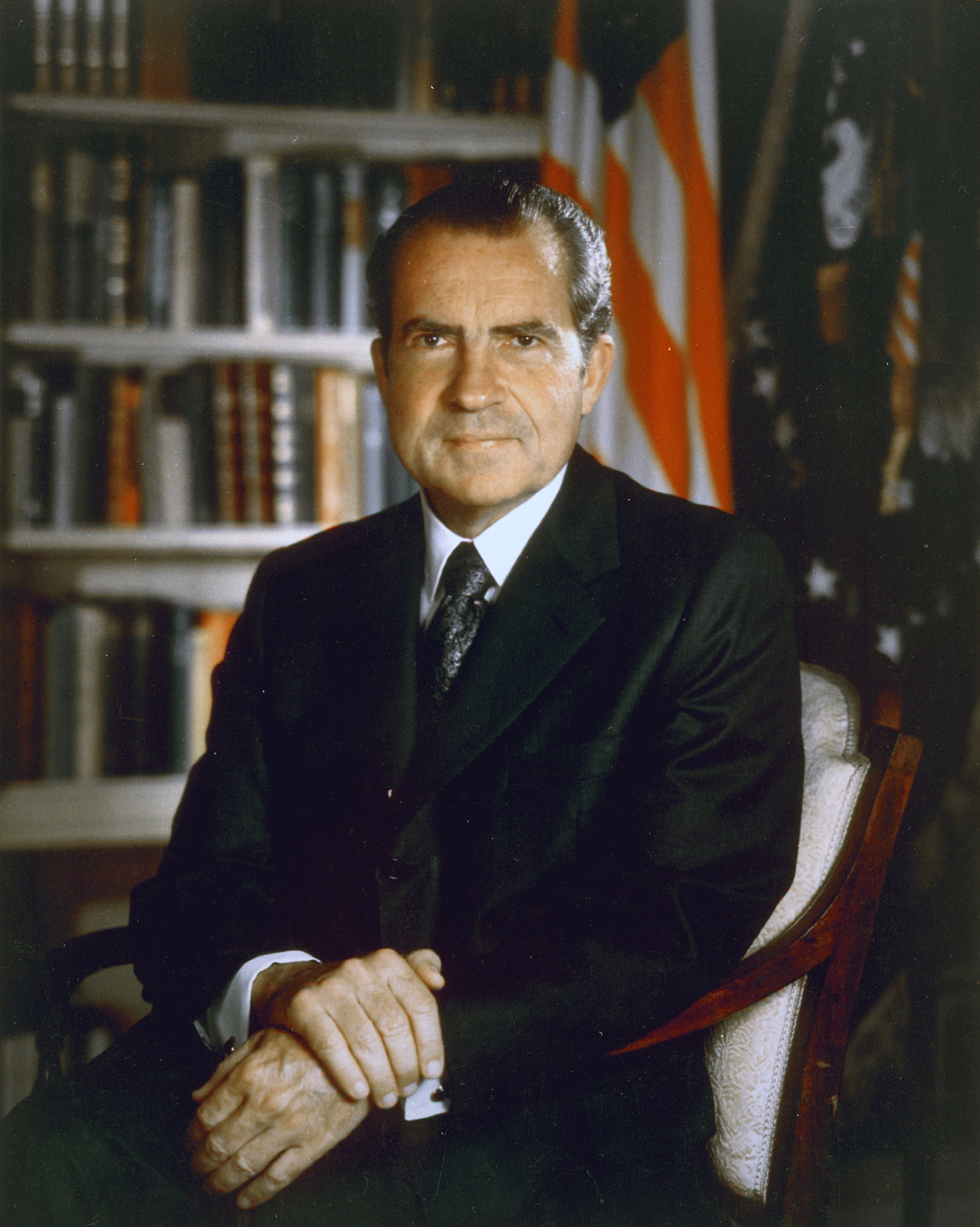
Following the "rediscovery" of hunger in America during the late 1960s, President Richard Nixon addressed Congress saying: "That hunger and malnutrition should persist in a land such as ours is embarrassing and intolerable.... More is at stake here than the health and well-being of 16 million American citizens.... Something very like the honor of American democracy is at issue."

By the turn of the century, improved economic conditions were helping to reduce hunger for all sections of society, even the poorest. The early 20th century saw a substantial rise in agricultural productivity; while this led to rural unemployment even in the otherwise "roaring" 1920s, it helped lower food prices throughout the United States. During World War I and its aftermath, the U.S. was able to send over 20 million pounds of food to relieve hunger in Europe. The United States has since been a world leader for relieving hunger internationally, although her foreign aid has sometimes been criticised for being poorly targeted and politicised. An early critic who argued against the U.S. on these grounds in the 1940s was Lord Boyd-Orr, the first head of the UN's Food and Agriculture Organization. It can also be said that the U.S. caused hunger internationally through developmental and colonial privatization practices.

The United States' progress in reducing domestic hunger had been thrown into reverse by the Great Depression of the 1930s. The existence of hunger within the U.S. became a widely discussed issue due to coverage in the Mass media. Both civil society and government responded. Existing soup kitchens and bread lines run by the private sector increased their opening times, and many new ones were established. Government sponsored relief was one of the main strands of the New Deal launched by President Franklin D. Roosevelt. Some of the government established Alphabet agencies aimed to relieve poverty by raising wages, others by reducing unemployment as with the Works Progress Administration. The Federal Surplus Relief Corporation aimed to directly tackle hunger by providing poor people with food. By the late 1940s, these various relief efforts combined with improved economic conditions had been successful in substantially reducing hunger within the United States.

According to sociology professor Janet Poppendieck, hunger within the US was widely considered to be a solved problem until the mid-1960s. By the mid-sixties, several states had ended the free distribution of federal food surpluses, instead providing an early form of food stamps, which had the benefit of allowing recipients to choose food of their liking, rather than having to accept whatever happened to be in surplus at the time. There was however a minimum charge; some people could not afford the stamps, causing them to suffer severe hunger. One response from American society to the rediscovery of hunger was to step up the support provided by private sector establishments like soup kitchens and meal centers. The food bank, a new form of civil society hunger relief agency, was invented in 1967 by John van Hengel. It was not however until the 1980s that U.S. food banks began to experience rapid growth.

A second response to the "rediscovery" of hunger in the mid-to-late sixties, spurred by Joseph S. Clark's and Robert F. Kennedy's tour of the Mississippi Delta, was the extensive lobbying of politicians to improve welfare. The Hunger lobby, as it was widely called by journalists, was largely successful in achieving its aims, at least in the short term. In 1967 a Senate subcommittee held widely publicized hearings on the issue, and in 1969 President Richard Nixon made an emotive address to Congress where he called for government action to end hunger in the U.S.

In the 1970s, U.S. federal expenditure on hunger relief grew by about 500%, with food stamps distributed free of charge to those in greatest need. According to Poppendieck, welfare was widely considered preferable to grass roots efforts, as the latter could be unreliable, did not give recipients consumer-style choice in the same way as did food stamps, and risked recipients feeling humiliated by having to turn to charity. In the early 1980s, President Ronald Reagan's administration scaled back welfare provision, leading to a rapid rise in activity from grass roots hunger relief agencies.

Poppendieck says that for the first few years after the change, there was vigorous opposition from the political Left, who argued that the state welfare was much more suitable for meeting recipients needs. This idea was questionable to many, while others thought it was perfect for the situation. But in the decades that followed, while never achieving the reduction in hunger as did food stamps in the 1970s, food banks became an accepted part of America's response to hunger.

The USDA Economic Research Service began releasing statistics on household food security in the U.S. in 1985.

In the 1980s under Reagan's administration, the Task Force on Food Assistance formally defined hunger in the US for the first time, stating it was a social phenomenon where one does not have the means to obtain sufficient food. This differentiated it from the medical definition of hunger, and meant that people could be considered hungry even with no physical conditions. Starting in 1995, a Food Security Supplement was added to the census to gather data on how many Americans struggle to acquire food, a survey that remains in place to this day. In 2006, a review of USDA hunger measurements led to the separate definitions of "food insecure" and "hungry", and created different levels of food insecurity based on data measurements.

In 1996, the Welfare Reform Act was passed, making EBT the mode of delivering benefits to participants in the Food Stamp Program. This act also gave states more control over administering the program, and added limitations to who was eligible for benefits.

Demand for the services of emergency hunger relief agencies increased further in the late 1990s, after the "end of welfare as we know it" with President Clinton's Personal Responsibility and Work Opportunity Act.

=== 21st century ===
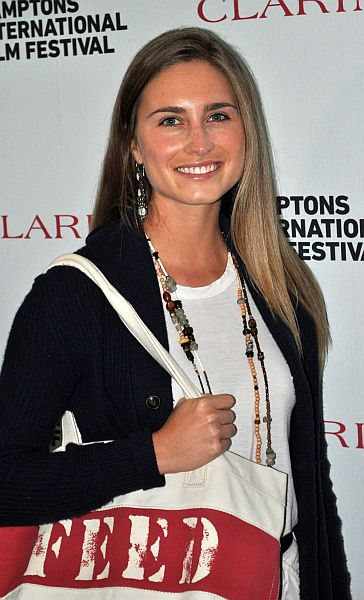
Lauren Bush at a 2011 party promoting her FEED charity, which helps fund the United Nations' efforts to feed children throughout the world

In comparison to other advanced economies, the U.S. had high levels of hunger even during the first few years of the 21st century, due in part to greater inequality and relatively less spending on welfare. As was generally the case across the world, hunger in the U.S. was made worse by the 2007–2008 world food price crisis and by the Great Recession. By 2012, about 50 million Americans were food insecure, approximately 1 in 6 of the population, with the proportion of children facing food insecurity even higher at about 1 in 4.

Hunger has increasingly begun to sometimes affect even middle class Americans. According to a 2012 study by UCLA Center for Health Policy Research, even married couples who both work but have low incomes will sometimes now require emergency food assistance.

In the 1980s and 90s, advocates of small government had been largely successful in un-politicizing hunger, making it hard to launch effective efforts to address the root causes, such as changing government policy to reduce poverty among low earners. In contrast to the 1960s and 70s, the 21st century has seen little significant political lobbying for an end to hunger within America, though by 2012 there had been an increase in efforts by various activists and journalists to raise awareness of the problem. American society has however responded to increased hunger by substantially increasing its provision of emergency food aid and related relief, from both the private and public sector, and from the two working together in partnership.

According to a USDA report, 14.3% of American households were food insecure during at least some of 2013, falling to 14% in 2014. The report stated the fall was not statistically significant. The percentage of households experiencing very low food security remained at 5.6% for both 2013 and 2014. In a July 2016 discussion on the importance of private sector engagement with the Sustainable Development Goals, Malcolm Preston, the global sustainability leader at Price Waterhouse Coopers, suggested that unlike the older Millennium Development Goals, the SDGs are applicable to the advanced economies due to issues such as hunger in the United States. Preston stated that one in seven Americans struggle with hunger, with food banks in the US now more active than ever.

In the wake of the COVID-19 pandemic, unemployment and food insecurity in the U.S. soared. In 2020, over 60 million people turned to food banks and community programs for help putting food on the table.

== See also ==
- A Place at the Table
- Economic issues in the United States
- Feeding America
- Poverty in the United States
  - History of poverty in the United States
- The Hunger Project
- United States Senate Select Committee on Nutrition and Human Needs
