= Special Milk Program =

U.S. federal aid program

1942 promotion of the Milk Program by the Agricultural Marketing Administration

In the United States, the Special Milk Program, sometimes known as the School Milk Program, offers federal reimbursements for milk served to children in an eligible participating outlet, which includes schools, child care institutions, settlement houses, homeless shelters, or summer camps. This federal aid program is administered by the United States Department of Agriculture (USDA) under the Food and Nutrition Service (FNS).

Depending on income, a student may buy subsidized "paid milk", or receive free milk. The Milk Program was designed as a form of agricultural subsidy to dairy farmers, as well as a means of raising milk consumption among school children.

== History ==
Originally, the program was variously referred to as either the School Milk Program, the Special Milk Program, or the Special School Milk Program. The "School Milk Program" name is still used by some sources.

With the United States having just entered World War II, the Department of Agriculture released a pamphlet promoting the Milk Program in 1942. It referred to milk as a "Victory Food", and stated that it hoped to reduce malnutrition and hidden hunger among American school children through the program. It was also intended to provide farmers with a fair return on their product.

Previously, the program was authorized under the Agricultural Act of 1954. The Department of Agriculture intended to provide students with wider access to milk. It was designed to provide price supports for dairy products. The Milk Program has served nonprofit camps run by organizations such as the Boy Scouts.

The Special Milk Program is now permanently authorized under the Child Nutrition Act of 1966 (P.L. 89-642, as amended; 42 U.S.C. 1771 et seq.). Originally, the Child Nutrition Act of 1966 only extended funding until June 30, 1970 but amendments to the act have extended funding in addition to support from the Secretary of Agriculture.

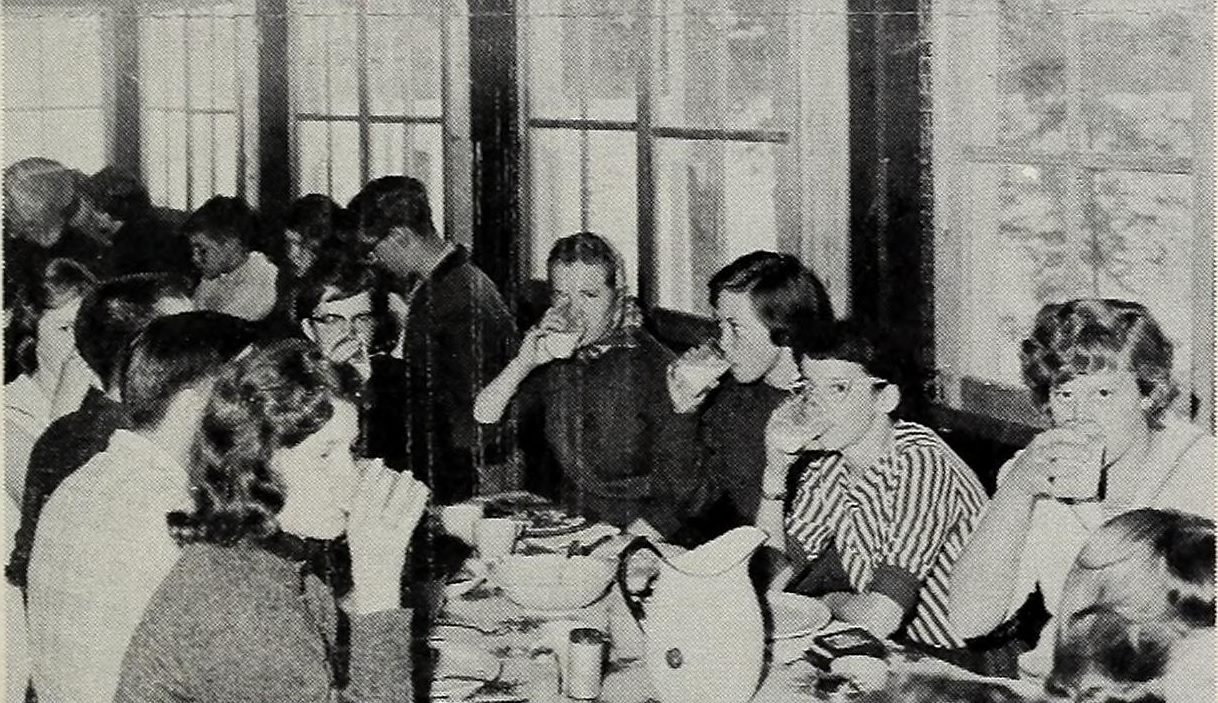
Campers at a summer camp in Winthrop, Maine drink milk subsidized by the Special Milk Program

The program is federally administered by the Food and Nutrition Service, and funded by annual agricultural appropriations. At a state-level the program is usually administered by state education agencies. Schools are reimbursed for each half pint served to eligible students. The reimbursement rate is determined every July 1 by the U.S. Department of Agriculture. The annual rate adjustment reflects changes in the Producer Price Index for Fluid Milk Products.

== Eligibility ==
Participating institutions must operate their milk programs on a non-profit basis. To be eligible for the Special Milk Program, an institution must not participate in other federally subsidized meal programs like the National School Lunch Program.

There is an exception from the eligibility limitation for kindergarten and pre-kindergarten children in split session programs, meaning "an education program operating for approximately one-half of the regular school day."

Schools may offer free milk to children meeting free lunch income requirements, if they choose, and this milk is reimbursed at full cost. Otherwise, children buy so-called paid milk, which is subsidized at a legislatively set rate for each half-pint served. A child's family must re-apply annually for free milk eligibility.

Only pasteurized fluid type fat-free or low-fat (1%) milk may be offered. Flavored milk is allowed for children six and over. With a doctor's note, a student may receive a substitute if they have a disability which prevents them from consuming cow's milk, granted certain nutrition standards are met for the substitute.

Any organization or facility that does offer milk under the Special Milk Program must hang a copy of the And Justice for All poster in a visible location in accordance with federal law. This poster offers information about the non discrimination requirement that is a key component of the program as well as information on how and where to file complaints in regards to the Special Milk Program.

== Budget and impact ==
A 1957 report found an increase in average daily milk consumption among school children in Los Angeles, at 68% in elementary schools, 250% in junior high schools, and 200% in senior high schools. A 1960 study found that children attending participating schools drank an average of 1.7 more ounces per capita per day of milk. A 1978 national survey by the Food and Nutrition Service found similar: the program raised student milk consumption by 42% in participating schools.

In 2008, 4,676 schools and residential child care institutions participated in the Special Milk Program, along with 743 summer camps and 522 non-residential child care institutions. Over 85 million half pints of milk were served that year through the program, down from 3 billion half pints served through it in 1969, 1.8 billion in 1980, and 181 million in 1990. The Special Milk Program's reach and budget has been reduced due to the expansion of the National School Lunch Program and School Breakfast Programs, which include milk.

Federal spending on the program was at 11.9 million by FY 2010. This was down from 101.2 million in FY 1970.

FY	Budget, in millions
1970	101.2
1980	145.2
1990	19.1
2000	15.4
2008	14.8
2010	11.9

== See also ==
- Butter mountain
- Child and Adult Care Food Program
- Got Milk?
- Government cheese
- National School Lunch Act
- School Breakfast Program
