= School Breakfast Program =

Federally subsidized US program providing breakfast at K-12 schools

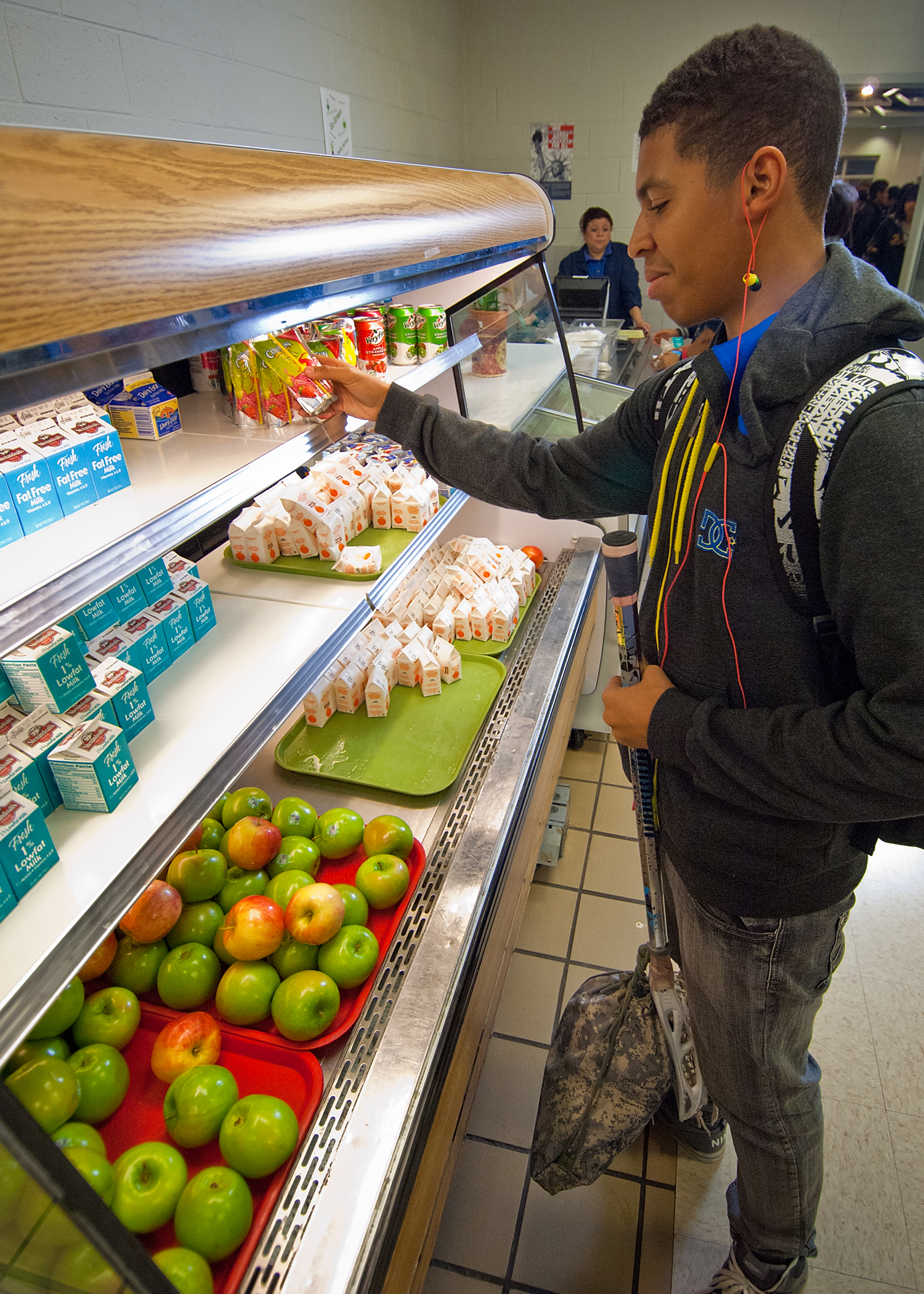
A student at a public school in Virginia selects fruit juice for breakfast

The School Breakfast Program (SBP) is a federally funded meal program that provides free and reduced cost breakfasts to children at public and private schools, and child care facilities in the United States. All children in participating schools and residential institutions are eligible for a federally subsidized meal, regardless of family income. However, free meals must be offered to children from families with incomes below 130% of the federal poverty level, and reduced price meals to those with family incomes between 130% and 185% of the poverty level. Those families over 185% poverty level have to pay full price for their meals which are set by the school. Even though the children have to pay for their own meals, the school is still reimbursed to some extent.

== History and implementation ==
The program began as a 2-year pilot project in 1966 designed to provide grants to assist schools serving "nutritionally needy" students. Original legislation within the Child Nutrition Act, required schools in poor neighborhoods and areas where kids had to travel a long distance to school to be priority recipients of the program. To encourage schools to participate, Congress allowed for higher payments to schools that were defined as being in "severe need". In its first year, the SBP spent US$573,000 serving about 80,000 children.

In 1971, fueled in part by the White House Conference on Food, Nutrition, and Health, Congress modified the program, making it available to schools who needed to improve nutrition and dietary practices of children in low income families and with working parents. In 1973, the way funding was reimbursed was changed from categorical grant reimbursement to per-meal reimbursement. The SBP was permanently authorized in 1975 for all schools who needed to provide better nutrition for their students and for higher reimbursement of the school. Federal funding is provided in the form of cash reimbursements for each breakfast served, varied in amount by the family income of the participating child. The most current reimbursement rates for participating schools are $1.55 for each free breakfast, $1.25 for each reduced-price breakfast, and $0.27 for each paid breakfast. A school may receive a higher reimbursement rate for serving free or reduced-price meals to more than 40% of their students in the previous year. The higher rates can be as much as $0.30 more than standard rates. Schools in Hawaii and Alaska receive higher reimbursement rates than the schools in the contiguous United States. The percentage of meals being served at these higher rates is about seventy-seven percent. These reimbursements are active from July 1, 2010 through June 30, 2013. The program is administered by the United States Department of Agriculture (USDA) Food and Nutrition Service (FNS) and funded by annual agricultural appropriations.

The USDA has to formulate their meal patterns and nutrition according to the Dietary Guidelines of Americans as directed by The Healthy, Hunger-Free Kids Act of 2010. There are plans in place for the SBP to gradually start changing their meals in 2013. Some of the changes include more whole grains, appropriate calorie counts according to grade, and lower sodium content. The sodium content must be reduced enough to meet standards, at the latest, by the 2022-2023 school year.

As of 2010, the School Breakfast Program was the second largest of the targeted food aid programs administrated by the Food and Nutrition Service (FNS), feeding 16 million children. This compares with the School Lunch program, which helped feed 32 million children a day in 2010. By FY 2018, the program would manage to provide more than 2.4 billion school breakfasts and allow 14.8 million children to receive free or reduced-price school breakfasts.

== Breakfast programs' effect on academic success ==
Researchers have extensively studied the relationship between breakfast consumption and academic performance. It has been noted that breakfast consumption has a positive impact on student’s academic achievement. There is evidence that school breakfast programs have positive effects on a student’s ability to learn and function in school. Past discoveries have been made that students who participate in school breakfast programs have higher standardized test scores and lower levels of absenteeism. More recent research has found a positive correlation between school breakfast program participation and academic grades, specifically in the subject of mathematics, along with a decrease in absences and lateness. This was demonstrated by a research study on sixth-grade students in a Midwest urban school district who ate breakfast and had significantly higher math scores than their peers who had low nutrient intakes. According to recent research studies at Tufts University and the Bogalusa (LA) Heart Study, children and adults who eat a healthy breakfast are more likely to improve their memory, concentration, energy, endurance and mood as well as attend school more often. Breakfast consumption is also associated with cognitive abilities such as creativity, reasoning, vocabulary, and problem solving.

Engagement in a breakfast program has also shown to have a positive influence on psychosocial behavior. In a study on high school students, male participants reported feeling more positive after eating a nutritious breakfast. Within the same study, both male and female student participants reported feeling more alert after breakfast consumption. All in all, healthy eating is essential for the growth and development of children and youth and schools have long been recognized as a setting for public health intervention. School breakfast programs have benefits for students’ academic, behavioral and social development.

== School lunch nutrition program ==
The Trump Administration has eased certain policies to make American school lunches healthier. Some health advocates perceive the move as a significant change on lunch policies of former President Barack Obama. There are fewer whole grains, more sugary chocolate milk, and an additional 300 milligrams of salt. According to Department of Agriculture Secretary Sonny Perdue, healthy meals given to school children since 2012 resulted in choosy kids who refused meals offered in their respective schools. This resulted to more food being thrown away and wasted. Recent research disputed the claim of Perdue citing the findings that children consume more veggies and a smaller amount of saturated fat at school.

Office of Budget Management Director Mick Mulvaney argued that proposed budget cuts for after-school programs came about because there is no clear proof that the practice of feeding and educating children to perform better does not actually work. Experts believe the proposal of Trump’s administration will set back the next stage of salt reduction by at least three years and eliminate further reductions that will happen following that development. Reductions of salt in school meals are based on recommendations from nutrition specialists of the World Health Organization, Centers for Disease Control and Prevention, American Heart Organization, and Dietary Guidelines for Americans.

== Partial Rollback to Obama-Era policy ==
A rollback to the Obama-era school meal policy was issued by the US Department of Agriculture on December 7, 2018. However, the rollback only gave schools the option rather than the requirement to opt out of the Obama-era policy.

== Increase in program participation ==
In FY 2018, the School Breakfast Program (SBP) had expanded to more than 2.4 billion breakfasts in the United States. Approximately 14.7 million students received free or reduced-price breakfasts in FY 2018 and 2019. These numbers were a significant increase from FY 1989, when 3.8 million students received free or reduced price breakfasts on a given school day, and a total of 658 million school breakfasts were served. Federal spending on the SBP also increased three percent in FY 2019 compared to the previous fiscal year.

== See also ==
- Share Our Strength
- School meal
