= School meal programs in the United States =

Universal school meal programs in the United States Permanent universal school meal program Permanent universal school breakfast program Former temporary universal school meal program No universal school meal program

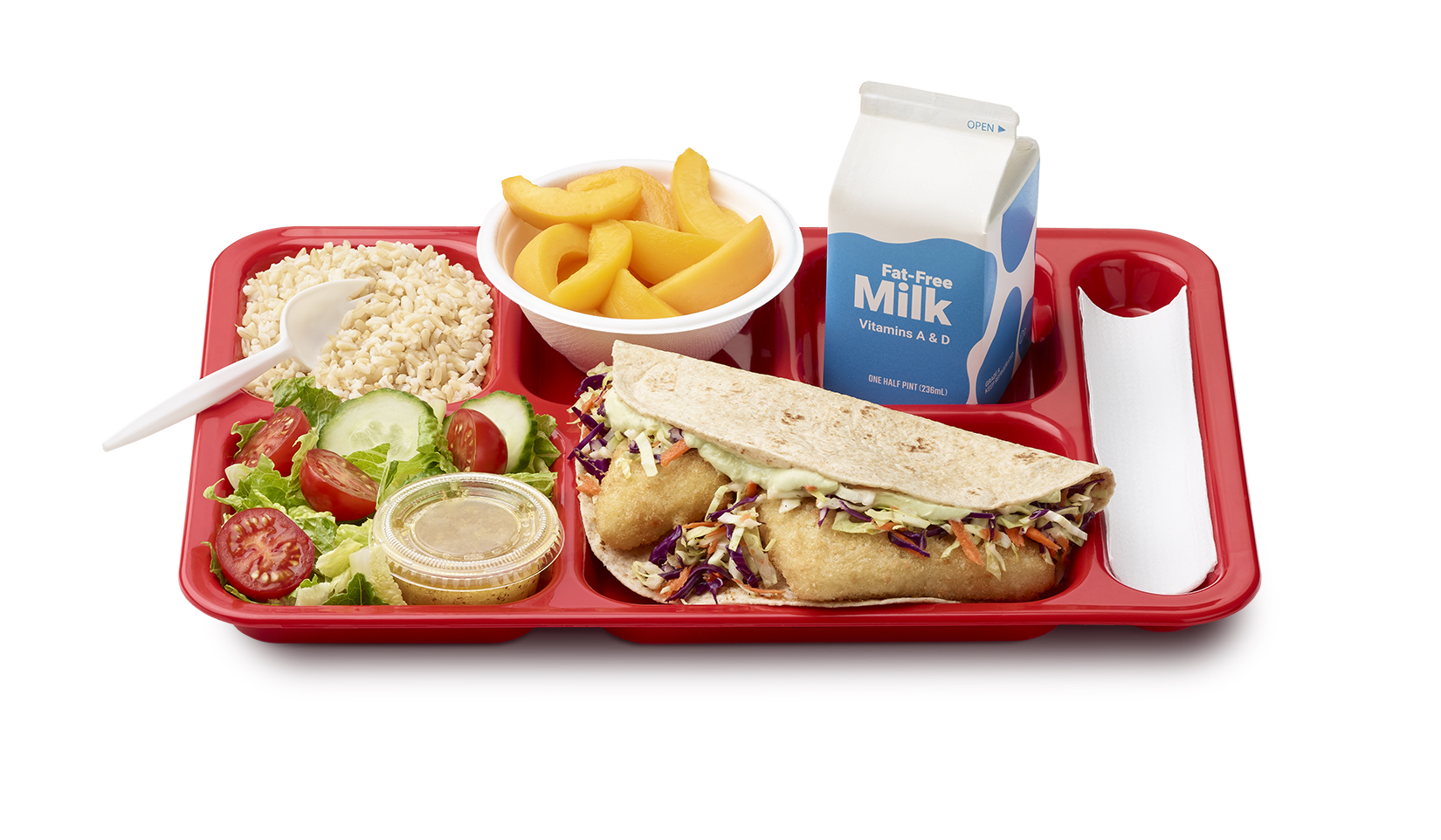
A school lunch tray served in Maine featuring all the MyPlate food groups recommended by the Department of Agriculture

In the United States, school meals are provided to students from low-income families either at no cost or at a government-subsidized price. These free or subsidized meals have the potential to increase household food security, which can improve children's health and expand their educational opportunities. A study of a free school meal program in the United States found that providing free meals to elementary and middle school children in areas characterized by high food insecurity led to increased school discipline among the students.

The biggest school meal program in the United States is the National School Lunch Program (NSLP), which was created under President Harry S. Truman in 1946. Its purpose is to prevent malnutrition and provide a foundation for good nutritional health. The text of the National School Lunch Act, which established the program, called it a "measure of national security, to safeguard the health and well-being of the nation's children and to encourage domestic consumption of nutritious agricultural commodities."

The NSLP currently operates in about 100,000 public schools, nonprofit private schools, and residential care institutions. In the fiscal year 2024, it served more than 4.8 billion lunches.

== Food insecurity in children ==
Food insecurity includes both inadequate quantity and inadequate quality of food. Children need not just enough calories, but also enough nutrients for proper growth and development, and improper or stunted growth can have a variety of medical and developmental implications. Food insecurity and malnutrition will affect children's educational outcomes, family life, and overall health. It has been linked to worse development outcomes for children, such as impaired social and reading skills.

=== Prevalence ===
Food insecurity has risen in recent years. Between 2007 and 2008, the rate in the U.S. increased from 11.1% to 14.6%, the largest annual increase since researchers began tracking the rate in the mid-1990s. Among households with children, food insecurity increased from 15.8% to 21% during that period.

Four million American children "experience prolonged periodic food insufficiency and hunger each year", which amounts to 8% of children under the age of 12. An additional 21% are at risk.

=== Implications ===
Food insecurity affects the health and well-being of children in several ways. It is a major threat to "growth, health, cognitive, and behavioral potential", and most behavioral, emotional, and academic problems are more prevalent among hungry children than non-hungry children. Food insecurity is linked to lower math scores, trouble getting along with peers, poor health, and more frequent illness. A study by researchers at the Boston University School of Medicine found that children aged 6–11 who came from food-insecure homes had lower arithmetic scores, were more likely to have repeated a grade or seen a therapist, and had more difficulty getting along with peers than similar children in food-secure homes. Hungry children are much more likely to have clinical levels of psychosocial dysfunction, and they show more anxious, irritable, aggressive, and oppositional behaviors than peers whose families are low-income but food-secure.

In addition to academic and behavioral problems, children with inadequate diets are more prone to illnesses. Researchers have found that malnutrition leads to an array of health problems that can become chronic. Underfed children may have "extreme weight loss, stunted growth, weakened resistance to infection", and even early death. Such ailments reduce the amount of time students can spend learning at school.

These cognitive, behavioral, and physical problems are exacerbated in children who, in addition to being undernourished, are from impoverished backgrounds. Scientists now believe that "malnutrition alters intellectual development by interfering with overall health as well as the child's energy level, rate of motor development and rate of growth." Moreover, "low economic status can exacerbate all [of] these factors, placing impoverished children at particular risk for cognitive impairment later in life".

Education and food both have an effect on the "central capabilities" described by Martha Nussbaum, an American philosopher. These capabilities, which Nussbaum saw as integral to raising people above the poverty threshold, are life, bodily health, bodily integrity, sense, imagination and thought, emotions, practical reason, affiliation, other species, play, and control over one's environment (both political and material). Nutrition affects bodily health and bodily integrity, and education has broader connections to sense, imagination and thought, practical reason, and control over one's environment. Without these capabilities, according to Nussbaum, people fall into poverty traps and lack the proper opportunities to rise out of them. Government efforts such as meal programs can prevent people from falling into poverty, as well as lift them out of it.

== History of school meal programs ==
=== Prior to the 1946 National School Lunch Act ===
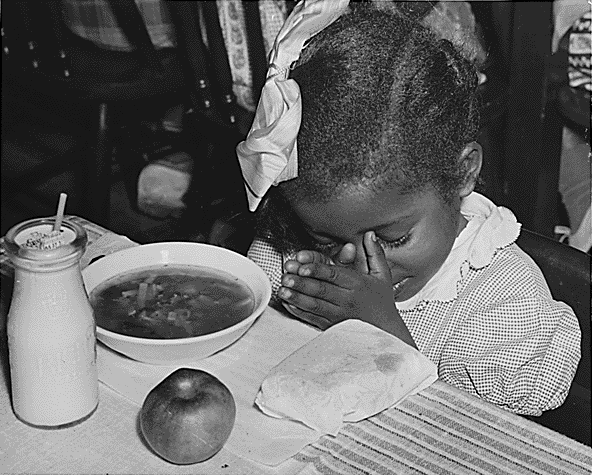
A School Lunch Program recipient in 1936

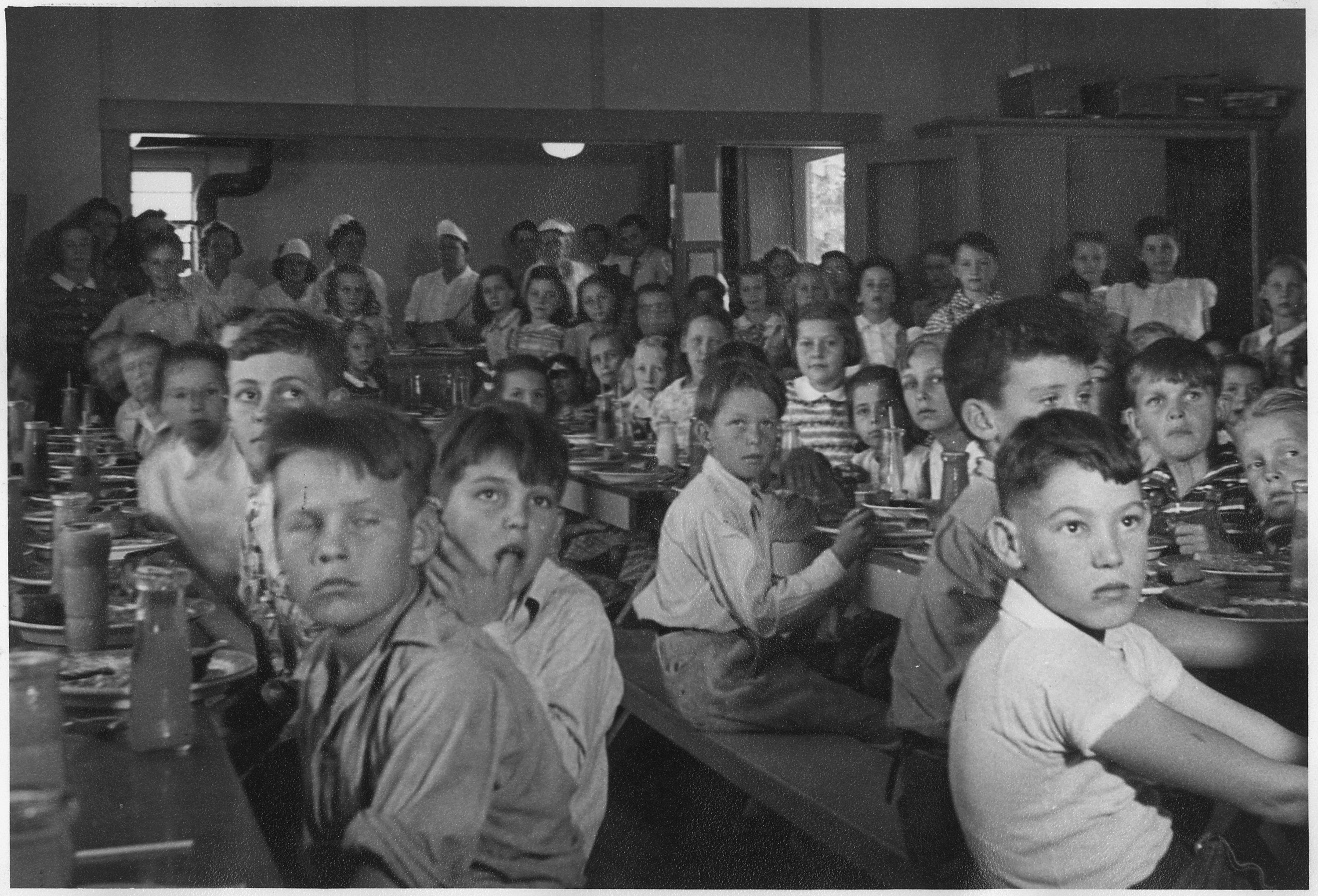
School lunch in Fresno, California, 1940

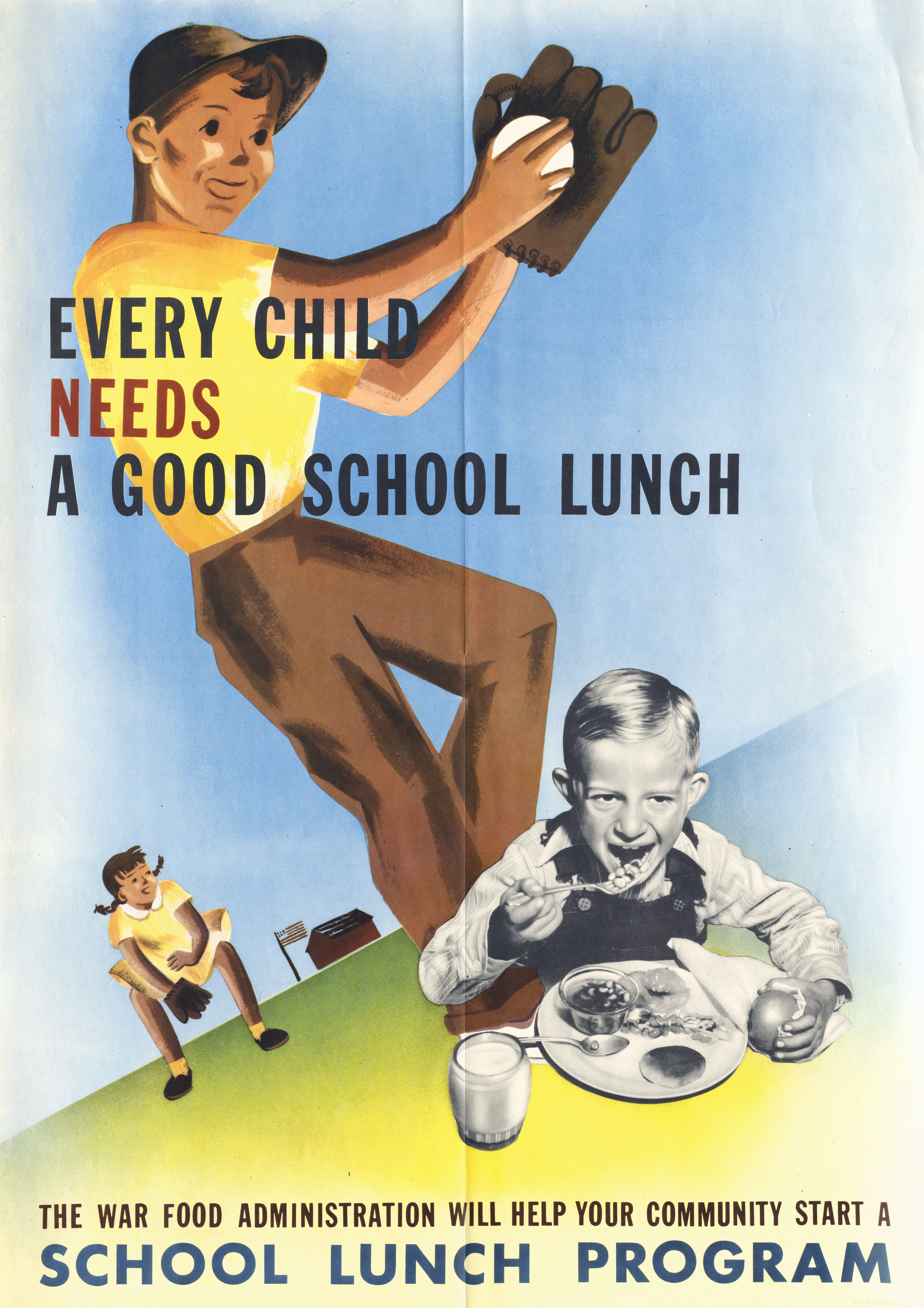
A poster produced by the War Food Administration promoting school lunches

Before the official establishment of the large-scale, government-funded food programs that are prevalent today in the United States, small, non-governmental programs existed. As early as the late 19th century, cities such as Boston and Philadelphia operated independent school lunch programs, with the assistance of volunteers or charities.

Until the 1930s, most school lunch programs were volunteer efforts led by teachers and mothers' clubs. These programs drew on the expertise of professional home economics. For the people who began these programs, school lunchrooms were the perfect setting in which to feed poor children and, more importantly, to teach immigrant and middle-class children the principles of nutrition and healthy eating.

During the Great Depression, the numbers of hungry children seeking food overwhelmed lunchrooms. Thus, local programs began to look to state governments, and then the national government, for resources. The national government began providing funding for school lunches on a small scale as early as 1932. This funding originated from New Deal agencies such as the Federal Emergency Relief Administration, the Reconstruction Finance Corporation, and the Civil Works Administration. The federal government monitored supplies from commercial farmers and purchased surplus commodities. Schools served as an outlet for federal commodity donations. In 1935, the programs expanded through the Works Progress Administration and the National Youth Administration, both of which provided labor for school cafeterias. During World War II, the War Food Administration (1943–45) helped create school lunch programs.

Eventually, the New Deal policies began to dissolve, and farm surpluses decreased. However, there was still a desire to keep school lunch programs in place, so federal cash assistance began to be appropriated on a year-to-year basis, and the National School Lunch Program was developed.

=== 1946–2000 ===
The United States Congress passed the National School Lunch Act in 1946.

By the end of its first year, the National School Lunch Program had helped 7.1 million children. However, from the start, the program linked children's nutrition to the priorities of agricultural and food interests, and to the agenda of the United States Department of Agriculture (USDA). In these early years, the program provided substantial welfare to commercial farmers as an outlet for surplus commodities, but provided few free meals to poor children and fed a relatively small number of schoolchildren.

In the 1960s, a group of mainstream national women's organizations began focusing on the shortcomings of the NSLP. The evidence they presented became crucial to Congressional debates on race and poverty. In 1962, Congress amended the NSLP, changing it from a distributor of state-regulated grant aid to a permanently funded meal reimbursement program. In 1969, President Richard Nixon pushed Congress to provide funding for school lunches beyond the reimbursement program, declaring, "The time has come to end hunger in America."

In between, in 1966, Congress passed the Child Nutrition Act, which stated that educational progress was an objective of school meal programs. The bill, signed by President Lyndon B. Johnson, created the federally subsidized School Breakfast Program (SBP), which supplemented the existing lunch program by providing low-cost or free breakfasts to students at public and nonprofit private schools. It also created the Summer Food Service Program and established National School Lunch Week.

By the end of the 1970s, many advocates saw privatization as the only way to keep school lunch programs going. Fast food from private companies began to be served in cafeterias, rather than more nutritious meals.

In 1994, a number of changes were made to the NSLP, primarily to standardize the nutritional quality of school meals. Dietary guidelines were proposed to take effect in 1996, and the USDA launched the Healthy School Meals Initiative to improve nutritional education for school-age children.

By the end of the 20th century, the NSLP was the nation's second-largest domestic food program, after the Supplemental Nutrition Assistance Program (more commonly known as food stamps).

=== Early 21st century ===
In 2004, as the childhood obesity crisis came into national focus, the USDA urged school districts to establish wellness policies and initiatives tailored to local needs. The USDA regulations were intended to strengthen nutritional education nationwide while giving schools the autonomy to decide what types of foods could be sold in their cafeterias and vending machines.

In 2007, the USDA hired the Institute of Medicine (IOM; now the National Academy of Medicine) to develop recommendations for "bringing school food up-to-date with current science". Dr. Virginia Stallings, a pediatric gastroenterologist at the Children's Hospital of Philadelphia who led the IOM team, concluded, "Since the school meal programs were last updated, we've gained the greater understanding of children's nutritional needs and the dietary factors that contribute to obesity, heart disease, and other chronic health problems."

In 2010, the Healthy, Hunger-Free Kids Act made the most sweeping changes in the history of the NSLP, putting vending-machine snacks and à la carte menu items under federal regulation for the first time. Championed by First Lady Michelle Obama and directed by the USDA, the law established guidelines requiring more fruits, vegetables, and whole grains in school meals. The guidelines, which took effect in the 2012–13 school year, also limited sodium, fat, and caloric intake based on students' ages.

Most students benefited from the NSLP, even if they did not receive free lunches, because the program also subsidized full-price meals in the majority of U.S. schools.

=== COVID-19 pandemic and universal eligibility ===
When the COVID-19 pandemic in the United States began in spring 2020, the Families First Coronavirus Response Act provided supplemental school lunch funding and allowed the USDA to waive requirements such as serving on school campuses, the number of meals per student per day, and eligibility restrictions. Permission was extended by the Consolidated Appropriations Act, 2021 in December 2020, and further by the American Rescue Plan Act, with USDA eventually allowing universal meals for the entire 2021-2022 school year. The subsidies were voluntary; about 90% of U.S. school districts participated with free lunch for all students.

Funding from the USDA and American Rescue Plan Act was used to fund a subsidy extension for the 2022-2023 summer and school year at a somewhat reduced level. The Keep Kids Fed Act, signed in June 2022, ended universal eligibility, but maintained temporary suspension of nutrition requirements (to accommodate supply chain issues) and on-campus delivery.

With federal support uncertain and eventually ending, some states began using their own funds for an extension of pandemic-era free universal school lunches. In 2021, California became the first state to have a universal school meal program for the state's public school students, followed shortly by Maine, in time for the 2021-2022 school year. As of August 2023, a total of eight states funded permanent universal free school lunch, with the addition of Colorado, Massachusetts, Michigan, Minnesota, New Mexico, and Vermont. Nevada adopted a temporary extension for the 2023-24 school year. A bill making breakfasts free for all students in Arkansas was signed into law in February 2025, designating revenue from medicinal cannabis to fund the program. Three months later, in May 2025, the New York State Legislature approved a universal free school meal program in the 2025-26 state budget, making it the ninth state to offer such free breakfasts and lunches.

Beginning in 2026, the Whole Milk for Healthy Kids Act permitted schools to serve whole milk and nondairy milk alongside fat-free and reduced-fat options and required schools to honor parental requests for nondairy milk. The legislation was considered a priority of the Make America Healthy Again movement.

== Organizational structure ==
=== National School Lunch Program ===
The Food and Nutrition Service (FNS), an agency of the USDA, administers the NSLP at the federal level. Within each individual state, the program is administered by a state agency, in most cases the Department of Education. (If state law prevents the state from administering the program, the appropriate FNS regional office may administer it instead.) The state official in charge of the NSLP works with individual school districts to make sure each lunchroom worker receives the necessary information and supplies and receives directions from the United States Secretary of Agriculture. School districts that choose to participate in the NSLP follow specific guidelines and receive federal subsidies for each meal they serve.

The NSLP has relationships with several other federal agencies and programs. For example, the Fresh Fruit and Vegetable Program, an initiative of the United States Department of Defense (DoD), allows schools to use USDA entitlement dollars to buy fresh produce. The NSLP also works closely with the Temporary Assistance for Needy Families program and the Supplemental Nutrition Assistance Program (SNAP).

Aside from its impact on public organizations, the NSLP also affects corporate vendors and local businesses. The program is designed to help local farmers by purchasing fresh fruits and vegetables, which make their way to schoolchildren. Additionally, many companies are reformulating their foods to meet federal guidelines so that they can sell their products to the government.

=== School Breakfast Program ===
The SBP began as a pilot program in 1966 and became permanent in 1975. It was developed specifically to help impoverished children; the "original legislation stipulated that first consideration for program implementation was to be given to schools located in poor areas or in areas where children had to travel a great distance to school", and in 1971, "Congress directed that priority consideration for the program would include schools in which there was a special need to improve the nutrition and dietary practices of children of working mothers and children from low-income families".

The SBP works in essentially the same way as the NSLP: Participating schools receive cash subsidies from the USDA for every meal they serve. They must meet federal nutrition requirements and offer free or reduced-price breakfasts to children who are eligible. The USDA provides technical training and assistance to help school workers prepare and serve healthy meals, as well as nutrition education to help children understand the links between diet and health.

In 1970, before it was made permanent, the SBP served 500,000 children. In fiscal year 2011, more than 12.1 million children participated each day, 10.1 million of whom received free or reduced-price breakfasts.

== Costs and funding ==
As of October 2024, states in the contiguous United States which serve lunches through the NSLP receive federal reimbursements at rates of $0.42 per full price meal, $4.03 per reduced price meal (meals which for which students cannot be charged more than 40 cents), and $4.43 per free meal. An additional $0.02 per meal served in a school which served 60% or more meals for free or at a reduced price in the 2022-2023 school year is given to the states. Participants in the SBP are given $0.39 per full price breakfast, $2.07 per reduced price breakfast, and $2.37 per free breakfast served, and schools which served 40% or more NSLP lunches at free or reduced-price received an extra $0.47 per reduced price or free breakfast served. States are given $0.11 per full price snack, $0.60 per reduced price snack, and $1.21 per free snack served in afterschool care programs.

For fiscal year 2011, the cost of the SBP was $3 billion, compared with $10.8 million in 1970. The cost of the NSLP was $11.1 billion in 2011, compared with $70 million in 1947.

Budget trends suggest that meal production costs over the last five years have been increasing faster than revenues. A report by the USDA's Economic Research Service in July 2008 suggested: "Cost pressures may be a barrier to improving school menus in some cases. The nationally representative School Lunch and Breakfast Cost Study II found that while the mean reported cost of producing lunch during 2005–06 was below the reimbursement rate, about one in four school districts reported costs above the reimbursement rate." It continued, "Further, the mean full cost of producing a lunch was higher than the reimbursement rate."

The study also found that reported costs rose, but full costs fell, from 1992–2005, reflecting an increase in the number of school food authorities being charged by school districts for indirect costs in response to the districts' own budget pressures (School Nutrition Association, 2006). Other sources of financial pressure include increases in health care costs for employees (GAO, 2003; Woodward-Lopez et al., 2005) and, more recently, rising food costs (FRAC, 2008).

In 2012, researchers compared the previous year's data with limited current-year data to see whether previously identified problems persisted. They found that in fiscal year 2011, the NSLP served 5.18 billion lunches at a cost of $11.1 billion, an increase of 181% from fiscal year 2000.

In terms of cost efficiency, one can compare the costs of NSLP-compliant lunches and lunches served in schools that do not participate in the program. Constance Newman's "The Food Costs of Healthier School" (2012) compared those costs during the 2005–06 school year. Newman found that healthy meals were more expensive than meals that did not meet the new nutritional standards. She also found that the "mean reported cost for a reimbursement lunch was $2.36, while the reimbursement rate was $2.51", or 106% of the cost. However, revenues for non-reimbursable meals (for example, adult lunches) covered only 71% of the cost of those meals.

To address this, the Healthy, Hunger-Free Kids Act of 2010 required gradual increases in reimbursements until 100% of costs were covered. In addition, the USDA increased School Food Authority (SFA) reimbursement rates by 6 cents per meal for the 2012–13 school year.

Not all of the cost increases Newman found were due to food prices; nearly half were associated with overhead, such as equipment, labor, and training. Additionally, her research, which relied on data from 2005 and 2006, is now outdated, and Newman acknowledged that "another important caveat is that the foods served in schools have changed since 2005".

Recently, there has been a push to privatize school meal programs because of their rising costs. Private food service companies have much greater purchasing power than school districts and are able to save money by providing fewer benefits and lower salaries to their employees.

=== Fraud ===
Members of the organization Feeding Our Future were charged with fraud of at least $250 million related to free school meals, with fraud of more than $40 million convicted in 2024.

== Participation and eligibility ==
Participation in the NSLP is voluntary. School districts and independent schools that choose to take part receive cash subsidies and donated commodities from the USDA for each meal they serve. In return, they must serve lunches that meet federal nutritional requirements, and they must offer free or reduced-price meals to eligible children. Schools can also be reimbursed for snacks served to children in after-school educational or enrichment programs.

In the late 1990s, NSLP officials determined in a "Study of Direct Certification in the National School Lunch Program" that the program's paper application process was inefficient and potentially excluded eligible school districts (Jackson, Gleason, Hall and Strauss, 2000). As a result, the program switched to a direct certification process, in which schools can use documentation from local or state welfare agencies to demonstrate their eligibility. Despite a lack of cooperation between the NSLP and some welfare agencies, the Food and Nutrition Service (FNS) found that direct certification significantly increased the number of participants. In 2008, Philip Gleason, a senior researcher for Mathematica Policy Research, wrote a paper affirming that direct certification expanded access to the NSLP.

However, some researchers have identified an opposite problem: the acceptance into the program of students who are not eligible for it. A three-year study by the FNS (Gleason, 2008) found that 77.5% of NSLP applicants were correctly certified. However, 15% were certified as eligible when they did not actually qualify, and 7.5% were denied benefits despite being eligible. While the amount of erroneous payments during the 2005–06 school year was relatively small as a percentage of the program's total cost, they totaled more than $759 million (Ponza, 2007). Subsequent research by Molly Dahl found that the problem continued, with an estimated overpayment of $1.5 billion in 2011.

David Bass wrote in 2009 that the problem was not simply an innocent one, but involved a calculated effort by school districts to commit fraud. He argued that, because "state governments dole out benefits according to free and reduced-price lunch percentages ... local school districts have a clear incentive to register as many students in the NSLP as possible". While the NSLP has a built-in verification process, only about 3% of applications can be reviewed to verify the reported income. Bass found that some school districts that wanted to verify higher percentages of applications were threatened with legal action from the federal government. He also identified one district that found that 70% of the applications it reviewed were incorrect.

== Nutritional guidelines ==
School lunches must meet the applicable recommendations of the Dietary Guidelines for Americans, which state that no more than 30% of an individual's calories should come from fat, and no more than 10% from saturated fat. School lunches must also provide one-third of the recommended daily allowances of calories, protein, vitamin A, vitamin C, iron, and calcium. However, decisions about what specific foods to serve and how to prepare them are made by local school officials. A 2007 study, based on research by the USDA during the 2004–05 school year, found that students in more than 90% of schools surveyed had the opportunity to select lunches that met dietary standards for fat and saturated fat.

School meal programs are increasingly using more whole grains, fruits and vegetables, lean protein, and low-fat dairy. Efforts such as the Local School Wellness Policies required by the 2004 Child Nutrition and WIC Reauthorization Act have gotten parents, students, and school communities involved in efforts to promote healthy eating and increased physical activity on school campuses.

In 2009, the National Academy of Medicine released School Meals: Building Blocks for Healthy Children, which reviewed and recommended updates to the NSLP and SBP nutrition standards and meal requirements. It also set standards for menu planning that focus on food groups, calories, saturated fat, and sodium, and that incorporate the Dietary Guidelines for Americans and the Dietary Reference Intake recommendations.

=== Unhealthy meals and malnutrition ===
Unhealthy school lunches contribute to malnutrition in both the short term and the long term. In many cases, unhealthy adult eating patterns can be traced back to unhealthy school lunches, because children learn eating habits from social settings such as school. A 2010 study of 1,003 middle-school students in Michigan found that those who ate school lunches were significantly more likely to be obese than those who did not.

Promoting healthy eating in schools may reduce adolescent obesity. One effort in promoting healthy eating is the Berkeley Food System, which uses vegetable gardens to promote education on healthy eating. Janet Brown, who started the project, explained that students were more likely to eat healthy foods such as fruits and vegetables when they were better introduced to them.

In 2008, the Economic Research Service of the USDA issued a report titled "The National School Lunch Program: Backgrounds, Trends, and Issues", which reaffirmed that one of the main goals of the NSLP, as identified by Congress, is to "promote the health and well-being of the Nation's children". According to the report, new challenges to this goal have emerged with increased scrutiny of high-fat commodities donated by the USDA, such as meat, cheese, and milk. The authors argue that providing high-fat USDA food subsidies contributes to childhood obesity. While NSLP participants have higher intakes of calcium and fiber—nutrients often under-consumed by children—they also have higher fat intakes. However, study results comparing weight gain among NSLP participants and nonparticipants are inconclusive.

A 2011 article in the Journal of Econometrics, "The impact of the National School Lunch Program on child health: A nonparametric bounds analysis", affirmed the nutritional advantages of the Healthy, Hunger-Free Kids Act but found that "children in households reporting the receipt of free or reduced-price school meals through the National School Lunch Program are more likely to have negative health outcomes than observationally similar nonparticipants". The authors asserted that specific groups were not receiving the expected nutritional benefits from the NSLP, and put forth two possible explanations: First, children receiving free or reduced-price meals are likely to differ from their peers in ways that are not reflected in the data. Second, the households of the children most affected by reduced-price lunches may be misreporting participation in the program.

==== Competitive foods ====
The USDA report in 2008 identified the emergence of "competitive foods" as an obstacle to the NSLP's nutritional goals. Competitive foods—which may include items purchased off campus, à la carte items purchased on campus, products from vending machines, food purchased for school fundraising, food available at school parties, and treats given to students by teachers—are not included in the NSLP reimbursement plan and so are not required to meet USDA standards. Generally speaking, competitive foods are lower in key nutrients and higher in fat than NSLP-reimbursable meals. The availability of such foods in schools often undermines the nutritional goals of the NSLP.

The study recommended that nutritional standards be applied to all food served or sold in schools. In addition, it noted that the Government Accountability Office (GAO) recommended in 2005 that the USDA's authority to regulate "foods of minimal nutritional value" be extended to a wider class of foods.

=== Obesity ===
Studies comparing NSLP participants and nonparticipants have been inconclusive on whether weight gain rates differ between the two groups. The 2008 Economic Research Service study found "similar calorie intakes for participants and nonparticipants but higher fat and sodium intakes for participants". The most obvious challenge to efforts to address such problems is that even if more nutritious foods are provided, there is no guarantee that students will eat them. Additionally, the NSLP does not take into account the physiological differences among participants: Some children are smaller than others, some are more athletic, and some have metabolisms that require more calories than the NSLP allows.

Three ideas have been proposed to address obesity in schools:

- Expose students only to fruits and vegetables as snacks. A 2009 Journal of Nutrition study, "Restricting Snacks in U.S. Elementary Schools Is Associated with Higher Frequency of Fruit and Vegetable Consumption", found that "children in schools with restricted snack availability had significantly higher frequency of fruit and vegetable consumption than children in schools without restricted snack availability", and suggested that a restrictive snack policy should be part of a multifaceted approach to improve children's diets.
- Educate all students about nutrition. A 2007 American Journal of Clinical Nutrition article, "APPLE project: 2-y findings of a community-based obesity prevention program in primary school-age children", stated, "A relatively simple approach, providing activity coordinators and basic nutrition education in schools, significantly reduces the rate of excessive weight gain in children."
- Encourage healthier meal selection without restricting choices. Researchers at Cornell University have suggested techniques based on behavioral economics, such as placing white milk in front of chocolate milk in coolers and moving and highlighting fruit displays.

== School nutrition and childhood obesity ==
The federal government became involved with school meals in the 1940s, responding to concerns that many children were not getting enough to eat. According to military officials at the time, a large number of young men in the United States were not fit for active duty because of undernourishment. In 1946, President Harry Truman (D, 1945–53) signed the National School Lunch Act into law, providing free school lunches for low-income students. In 1966, the Child Nutrition Act shifted control of the school lunch program from a number of government agencies to one, the USDA.

In the decades since then, childhood weight gain has become a major concern of health experts, as the percentage of children who are overweight has been increasing. According to the Centers for Disease Control and Prevention (CDC), for instance, the percentage of overweight children between the ages of six and eleven in 2003-04 was more than double that of the late 1970s. As the number of overweight and obese students increased, the focus of school nutrition shifted from its original concern – making sure that students had enough to eat — to its more recent preoccupation with preventing weight gain.

In 1994, President Bill Clinton (1993-2001) signed the Child Nutrition Reauthorization Bill, which required schools to set limits on the fat content of school lunches. According to a 2001 USDA report, lunches became significantly healthier in the years after the law passed.

However, the report also found that, besides lunches, less-healthy competitive foods were available in many schools, and that those options sometimes provided an incentive for students to skip school lunch altogether. Competitive foods have presented an obstacle to the USDA's regulation of food in schools. In 1983, a federal court overturned a USDA regulation that had prohibited the sale of junk food in schools from the beginning of the school day until the end of the last meal period. The court ruled that the USDA could ban junk food in cafeterias only during mealtimes.

The USDA does place some restrictions on competitive foods, requiring them to contain at least 5% of the recommended daily allowance of a number of specific nutrients, including protein and certain vitamins. But those restrictions have drawn criticism for not limiting foods with ingredients that can be unhealthy, such as sugar, fat, and salt, or those exceeding a certain number of calories. As a result, schools cannot sell chewing gum or breath mints, for instance, because they do not contain the required nutrients, but can sell candy bars and french fries, because they do — even though they also contain large amounts of sugar and fat, respectively.

== Outcomes ==
=== Educational attainment ===
Studies have shown a positive correlation between school meal programs and increased food security. Among low-income children, the marginal food insecurity rate of those with access to the School Breakfast Program is lower than that of those children without access to the program.

This increase in food security has not been shown to have significant long-term health benefits, but it does have a positive impact on education. Subsidized lunches appear to encourage children to attend school, and to free up food at home for other family members to consume. Public-policy researchers at Georgetown University found in 2010 that "increasing NSLP exposure by ten percentage points results in an average increase in education of .365 years" for girls, and "increases average education by nearly a year" for boys. The researchers found that participation in grades seven through twelve "has a stronger effect on educational attainment than participating in the earlier grades does, whereas there is some evidence suggesting that participation in earlier grades is more important for the health outcomes".

=== Student reactions ===
An article in The Wilson Quarterly in 2011 described the impact of the NSLP in the Maplewood–Richmond Heights School District in the St. Louis suburbs, where participation in the program is increasing. Linda Henke, the superintendent of the school district, said: "I was struck by the positive vibe around the revamped program. A teacher said he'd lost seven pounds by eating in the high school cafeteria every school day for the previous three months. A senior girl who had embraced the changes from the beginning observed that even she was surprised when football players started eating salads. The elementary school's cook of 14 years told me her job is now harder, but it's rewarding." The article continued: "It takes a tough-minded school leader to assert that nutrient-rich food is the right choice for kids—and that it's an appropriate use of government dollars. Kids will complain initially but will come around. And a number of collateral benefits follow when students eat well. Anecdotal reports from schools with healthful and flavorful food indicate that teachers have started eating with students, attendance rates are higher, and fewer students fall asleep in class or commit vandalism and violence at school."

Another article examined the program's effects within the Los Angeles Unified School District. The district's food service director, David Binkle, said: "From what I see and what I hear now that students are getting used to [the new menus] and they have tasted it, they like it. Any time you make a change, and the major change like this, that's an evolution that we have to go through. There's going to be people now saying the meal is too healthy for the kids and it's stuff they don't know. The reality of this is the rest of the country is about to see what we've gone through [when they adopt the new meal pattern regulations]. We did this on purpose so that we could really get out ahead of this and start to work through it and adjust. I think the rest of the country is going to see a lot of the same impact [that we've seen this year]." Binkle added, "What I keep hearing from the principals is that as we keep tweaking and teaching and encouraging the kids, more and more kids are participating."

Research overwhelmingly shows an upward trend in NSLP participation. However, the Wilson Quarterly article described a challenge: "Since 2004, the USDA has administered the HealthierUS School Challenge, awarding distinction but no money, to schools that voluntarily improve the healthfulness of their meals. By last fall, only a paltry 841 of the 101,000 schools in the NSLP (less than 1%) had received awards. That leaves a lot of schools that are still promoting Tater Tot Day and reheating frozen pizzas." The HealthierUS School Challenge (HUSSC) is a voluntary certification initiative recognizing schools that have created healthier environments by promoting nutrition and physical activity. Schools that apply may be awarded HUSSC certification and monetary incentives. As of March 11, 2014, there were 6,706 schools certified, which is 6% of the schools participating in the NSLP.

== During COVID-19 ==
Between March and April 2020, schools around the country abruptly closed due to the COVID-19 pandemic. In order to continue to provide students with school meals while learning remotely, the USDA was able to make temporary changes to its rules, waiving the requirement that meals must be served in a group setting in order to qualify for reimbursement. In the US, 15.2% of children are food-insecure, and 22 million out of the 30 million students who eat school lunch every day rely on free or reduced-price school meals.

In response to the COVID-19 emergency, the USDA issued several other waivers to facilitate meal service outside of the cafeteria, including one which, for the duration of the public health emergency, no longer requires schools to meet meal pattern requirements for school breakfast and lunch, allowing schools for more flexibility in the event of supply chain disruptions, and another that allows schools to serve multiple meals at once, so that families can pick up a breakfast and lunch at one time.

The Families First Coronavirus Response Act of 2020 authorized states to administer payment of Pandemic Electronic Benefit Transfer (P-EBT) food benefits to households with children who would have received free school lunches under the National School Lunch Act, if not for a school closure. These temporary food benefits were meant to help cover the cost of meals children would have otherwise received at school from March through June during the 2019-2020 school year.

== See also ==
- Lunch shaming
- Reduced-price meal
- School nutrition programs in California
- Special Milk Program
- Summer lunch programs in public libraries
