= Commodity Distribution Program =

The Commodity Distribution Program, a program under Section 14 of the Richard B. Russell National School Lunch Act (NSLA) (P.L. 79-396, as amended), requires the Secretary of Agriculture to use agricultural surplus removal funds (Section 32) and Commodity Credit Corporation (CCC) funds to buy commodities for child and elderly nutrition programs. The Secretary is directed to use Section 32 funds not needed for other purposes and CCC funds (if stocks are not available) to buy commodities for donation to maintain the annually programmed level of commodity assistance for Child and Elderly Nutrition programs mandated by the National School Lunch Act, Child Nutrition Act (P.L. 89-642, as amended; 42 U.S.C. 1771 et seq.), and Older Americans Act (P.L. 89-73; 42 U.S.C. 3001 et seq.).
