= Fulton Street Farmers Market =

Farmers' market in Grand Rapids, Michigan, USA

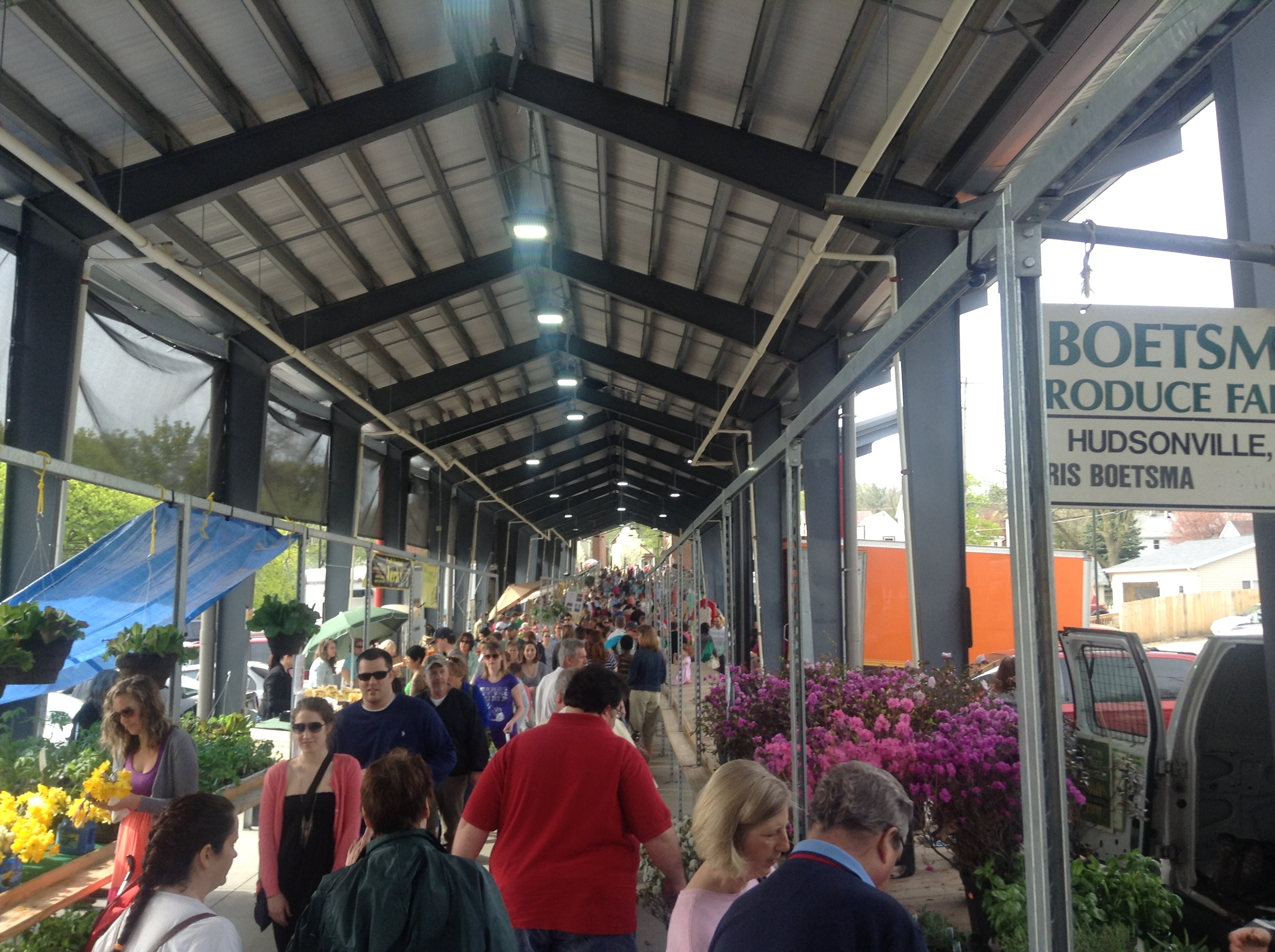
- Farmers Market under the new roof
- Location: 1145 Fulton Street East, Grand Rapids, MI 49503; Fulton Street west of Fuller Avenue, Grand Rapids; 42°57′46″N 85°38′26″W
- Opening date: 1922
- Management: Rori Weston
- Environment: Outdoor market with roof, small indoor retail hall
- Goods sold: Fruit and vegetables, dairy, meats, honey, syrup, baked goods, condiments, crafts
- Days normally open: Wed, Fri, Sat (May to October ) Sat only (Nov-Apr)
- Number of tenants: 200 vendors in a year
- Parking: Limited
- Interactive map of Fulton Street Farmers Market

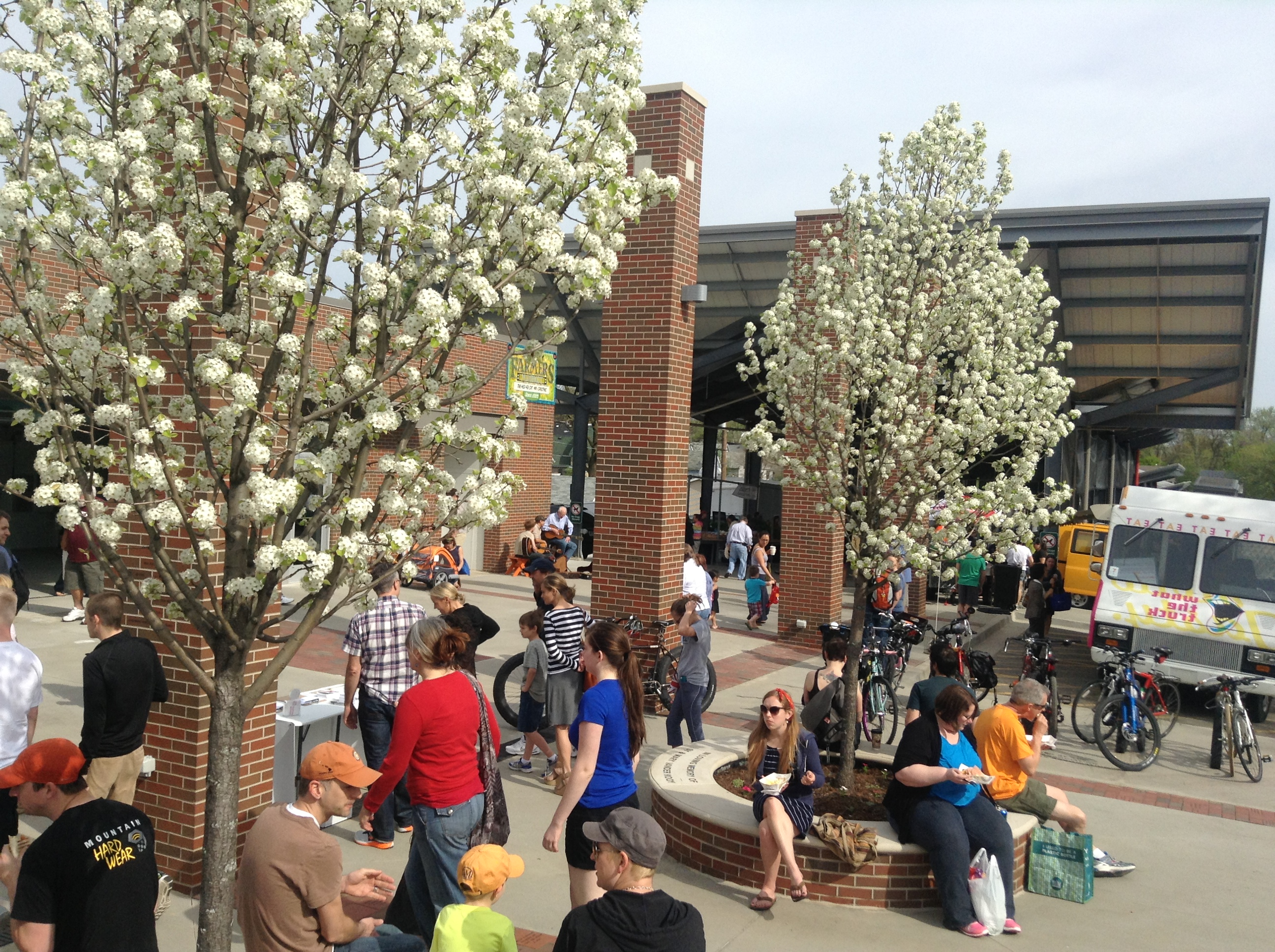
Fulton Street Farmers Market on opening Saturday of its 2013 summer season.

Fulton Street Farmers Market is a farmers market that opened in 1922 in the Grand Rapids, Michigan area.

== History ==
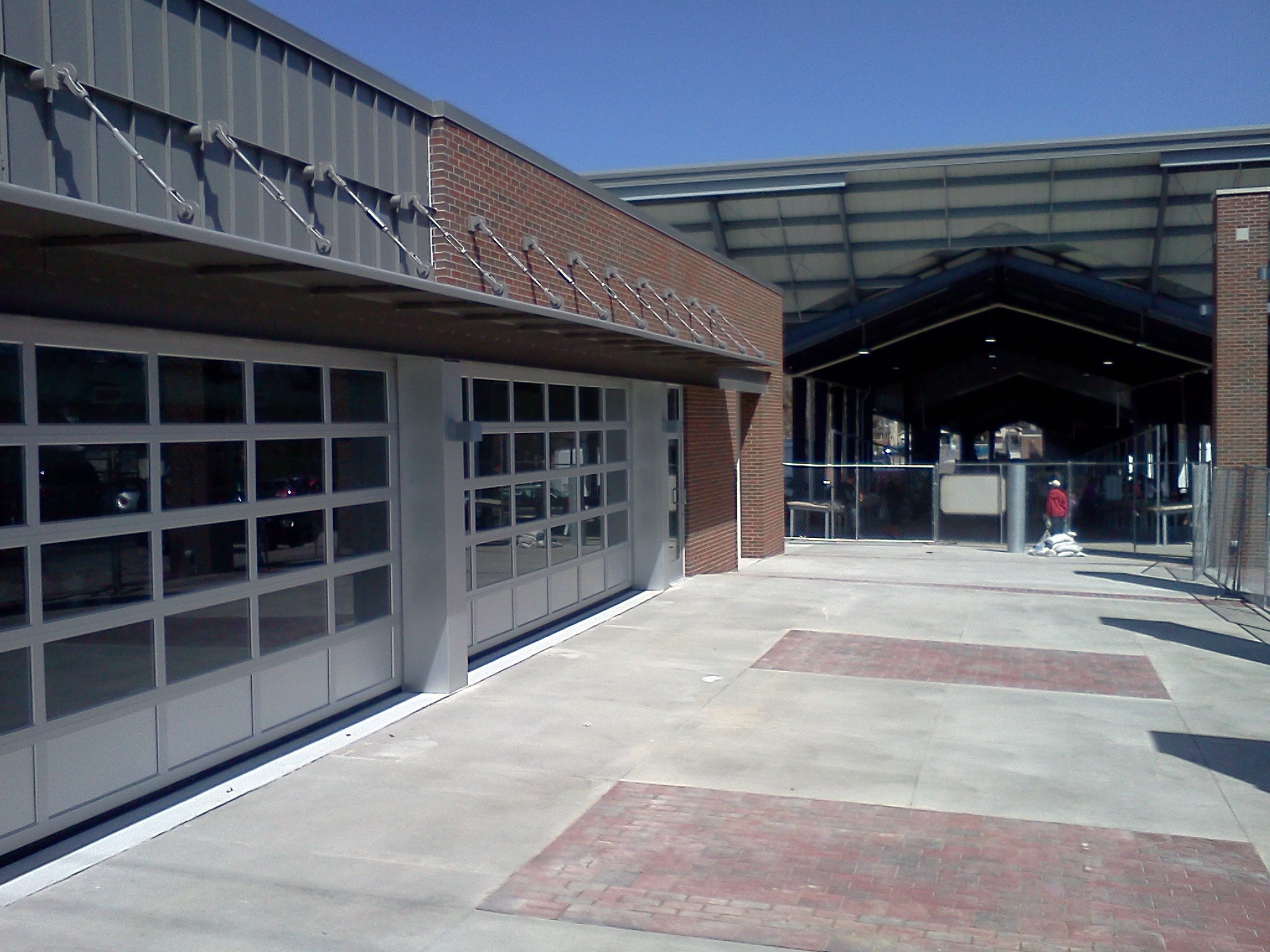
Newly completed indoor market hall and market office at Fulton Street Farmers Market.

During the 1800s, farmers would gather in the downtown streets to sell their wares. However, by the turn of the century, it became illegal to sell along the streets. Farmers were directed to a large market on an island in the river if they wished to sell. By 1914, local women, part of the Grand Rapids Federation of Women's Clubs, lobbied for the city to establish a dedicated space for the farmers to sell their products. The new farmers market opened on Leonard Street and quickly gained popularity. Other markets opened in the city and enjoyed similar popularity.

The market on Fulton Street began in 1922, coinciding with the opening of many other markets in Michigan. It continues to operate at its original location and configuration. For an extended period, the market was organized under the Public Services Department of Grand Rapids. Eventually, the City Parks and Recreation Department assumed leadership and organization, and the market was designated a city park.

The market underwent a $3 million renovation in 2012 and 2013. A roof was added in 2012, along with a refurbished outdoor market space and permanent stalls with electricity and lighting. In May 2013, a year-round vendor building was inaugurated. The 2,000-square-foot facility includes vendor space, restrooms, the market office, and an information desk.

== Payment Options ==
All eligible vendors at the market accept SNAP, Double Up Food Bucks, and WIC (including Project Fresh). The market was among the largest participants in a pilot program for mobile digital payments.
