= WIC program =

U.S. federal government program

Eligibility & Prescription Logic
Income Ceilings (July 1, 2026 – June 30, 2027)
- Household of 1 Limit: $2,461 / mo ($29,526 / yr)
- Household of 2 Limit: $3,337 / mo ($40,034 / yr)
- Household of 4 Limit: $5,088 / mo ($61,050 / yr)
- Adj. Per Extra Member: +$876 / mo (+$10,508 / yr)

Dual-Gate Admission Framework
- Gate 1: Financials: Household gross income must sit at or below 185% FPL. Adjunct eligibility applies if the applicant is already on SNAP, Medicaid, or TANF.
- Gate 2: Medical Assessment: A clinic health professional must establish a clinical or diet-based nutritional risk (e.g., anemia, historical pregnancy anomalies, metabolic deficiencies).

Food Package Prescription Math
- Benefits do not taper like cash; participants receive 100% of their designated categorical food package tier, custom-tailored down only for medical or personal rejection: • Fully Formula Fed Inf. (0-3mo): Up to 806 fl oz/mo  • Fully Breastfed Inf. (6-11mo): 24 oz cereal, 128 oz purees  • Children (1-4yrs): 16 qts milk, 36 oz cereal, 2 doz eggs  • Breastfeeding Women: 24 qts milk, 30 oz fish, 1 lb grains

Cash Value Benefit (CVB) Math
- Fruit & Veggie Stipend: A fixed monthly dollar stipend loaded to the eWIC card, adjusted annually for inflation to protect fresh purchasing power against baseline retail grocery index increases.
- Administration: Funded via USDA domestic discretionary appropriations; distributed via state agencies and tribal organizations.

Official Portal
- USDA FNS WIC Center

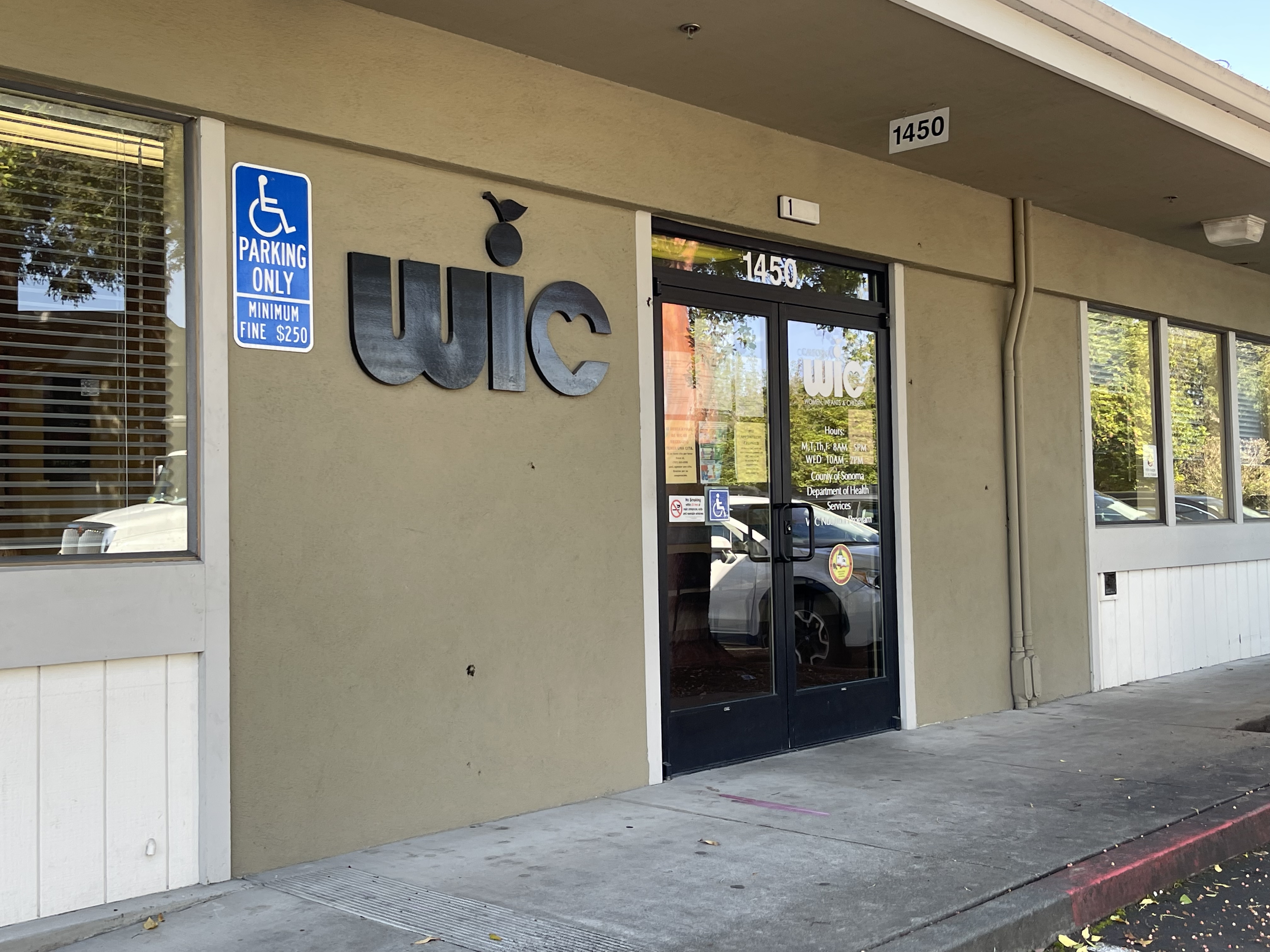
A WIC office in Santa Rosa, California, in 2023

The Special Supplemental Nutrition Program for Women, Infants, and Children (WIC) is an American federal assistance program of the Food and Nutrition Service (FNS) of the United States Department of Agriculture (USDA) for healthcare and nutrition of low-income pregnant women, breastfeeding women, and children under the age of five as part of child nutrition programs. Their mission is to be a partner with other services that are key to childhood and family well-being. WIC serves 53% of all infants born in the United States.

The basic eligibility requirement is a family income below 185% of the federal poverty level. Most states allow automatic income eligibility, where a person or family participating in certain benefits programs, such as the Supplemental Nutrition Assistance Program, Medicaid, or Temporary Assistance for Needy Families, may automatically meet the income eligibility requirements.

== History ==
The WIC Program began as a pilot program through an amendment to section 17 of the Child Nutrition Act of 1966 and passed on September 26, 1972. The legislation, P.L. 92-433, sponsored by then Senator Hubert Humphrey, (D) of Minnesota, established the Special Supplemental Food Program for Women, Infants, and Children (WIC) as a two-year pilot program. Eligibility was limited to children up to age four and excluded non-breastfeeding postpartum women. By the end of 1974, WIC was operating in 45 states. On October 7, 1975, WIC was established as a permanent program (P.L. 94-105). Eligibility was extended to non-breastfeeding women (up to six months postpartum) and children up to five years of age. Eligibility was based on income, life stage, and nutrition risk. In 1978, P.L. 95-627 defined nutrition risk and established income eligibility standards that were linked to the income standards associated with free and reduced price school meals. Another income standard change took place in 1989, when P.L. 101-147 established similar income eligibility for Supplemental Nutrition Assistance Program (SNAP), Medicaid, and AFDC participation, thus lowering the WIC income standard and simplifying the application process. WIC began to promote and support breastfeeding women in the late 1980s, and in 1989 Congress mandated $8 million be used specifically for that purpose. Also in 1999, the WIC program standardized nutrition risk criteria for program eligibility and began assigning individual nutrition risk priority levels.

In December 2000, the White House issued an executive memorandum authorizing the WIC program to begin screening clients for childhood immunization status. The motivation for this was that WIC had the access to the greatest number of low-income children and thus had the greatest potential for helping immunization rates. They also directed that immunization screening and referral become a standard part of WIC certification. It mentioned that the new WIC minimum immunization screening and referral is only for use in the WIC program. Across WIC programs, it has become standardized as an accurate, efficient and appropriate screening and referral process. WIC state and local agencies must coordinate with the providers of immunization screening.

Then, in 2004, the Breastfeeding Peer Counselor Initiative was launched in which women with breastfeeding experience became counselors for women learning how to breastfeed. Five years later in 2009, the USDA introduced a new food package with foods consistent with the Dietary Guidelines for Americans as well as establish dietary recommendations for young children. In addition, mothers who exclusively breastfeed receive more healthy foods.

== Eligibility ==
Applicants to the WIC program must meet eligibility requirements in four areas: (1) categorical, (2) residential, (3) income, and (4) nutrition risk.

The categorical requirement simply means that each participant must fall into one of three major categories:
1. Women:
  - Pregnant (during their pregnancy and up to six weeks after birth or at the end of the pregnancy)
  - Postpartum (up to six months after giving birth or end of pregnancy)
  - Breastfeeding (up to their infant's first birthday)
2. Infants up to their first birthday
3. Children up to their fifth birthday
Income
To be eligible on the basis of income, applicants' gross income (i.e., before taxes are withheld) must fall at or below 185 percent of the federal poverty line. State income falls between 100 percent and 185 percent of federal poverty guidelines, though most states use the maximum guideline. This is approximately $45,000 annually for a family in the contiguous US since 2016.
Residential
Must be a resident of the state to which they are applying for assistance.
Nutrition risk
Must have a nutritional risk assessment by a qualified health professional (physician, nurse, or nutritionist). The Nutritional evaluation is based on height, weight, and growth assessment; hematocrit or hemoglobin levels; general health history; and a diet

== Services ==
=== General services ===
Once applicants meet the eligibility requirements, they can expect to receive WIC assistance in the following four areas:

Supplemental food
Food checks or an EBT card are issued to program participants that allow them to buy nutritious food that help them meet their needs at stores that have contracted with the government to accept these checks in exchange for merchandise.
Formula
WIC Laws and Regulations state, infant formula can only be changed from a non-contracted brand by medical documentation. The formula vouchers provided to the participant are not selected based upon nutritional or health benefits but upon lowest bidder status: "Competitive bidding means a procurement process under which FNS or the state agency selects a single source (such as a single infant formula manufacturer offering the lowest price), as determined by the submission of sealed bids, for a product for which bids are sought for use in the Program."
Nutrition education
WIC participants are offered free health and nutrition education classes which help them understand their specific nutrition needs and learn about health prevention and improvement strategies.
Access to healthcare and other social services
Program participants receive guidance and assistance in accessing other important services such as prenatal programs, immunizations and child clinics, and drug and alcohol treatment programs.
Breastfeeding support
Program participants also receive guidance and support materials from Certified Lactation Educators about the benefit of breastfeeding and proper breastfeeding techniques.

=== Nutrition education and anemia screening ===
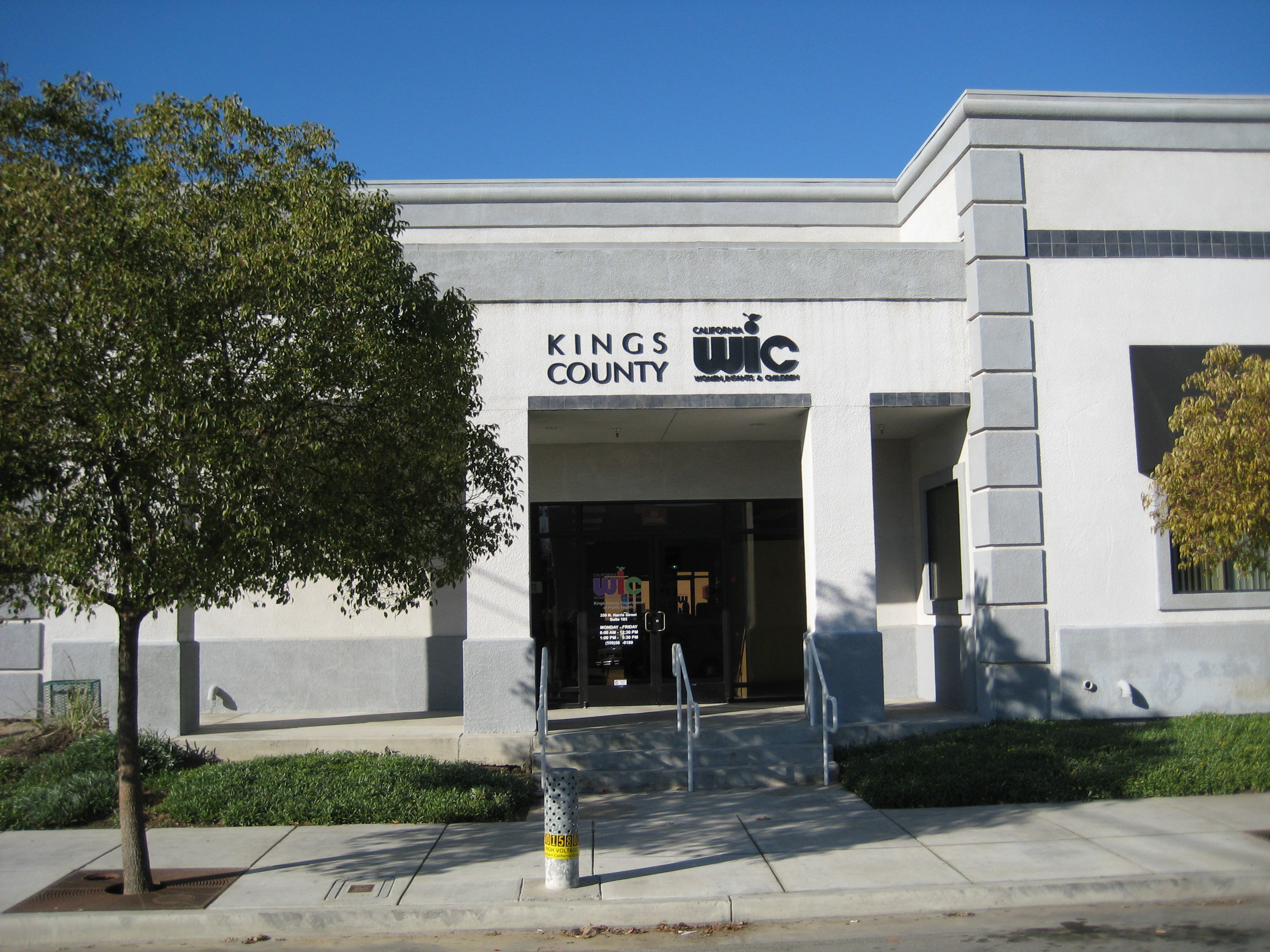
WIC program services are offered at this office in Hanford, California, by the Kings County Department of Public Health.

Nutrition education ranges various topics including healthy eating, appropriate infant feeding, and breastfeeding. Additionally, the WIC program also screens for anemia in participants over 12 months old. Depending on the state, nutrition education is provided via a Registered Dietitian, an individual with a bachelor's degree in nutrition or related field, or another certified professional authority. WIC agencies are required to stress the long-term benefits of nutrition education, although participating in this education is not compulsory for WIC recipients.

=== Check/voucher and EBT card ===
WIC participants often receive a monthly check or voucher, or more recently an EBT card. The USDA implemented new rules in 2006 that required foods to be more price-competitive. This has resulted in the closure of many "WIC Only Stores". Formerly, these stores charged the maximum permitted under the program, charging up to 16% more than regular stores for the same food. However, the WIC program is one of the most cost-effective government programs. A study of birth outcomes showed benefit-to-cost ratios ranging from $1.77 to $3.13 in Medicaid costs saved for each $1 spent on WIC.

The WIC check/voucher is a specially designed check that is compatible with retail point-of-sale check readers and printers. The front of the check displays the recipient's name and recipient number, a begin use- and an end-use date, a list of allowable items to be purchased with the check/voucher, including the quantity and/or maximum weight of the allowed items listed. The WIC recipient can choose if they want only some or all of the items listed on the check. The check also has an area for the cashier to enter the sale total, and an area for the recipient to sign the check/voucher at the time of use. The checks make use of MICR for enhanced security and ease of processing.

Alternately, many states (notably Texas and Nevada) have moved away from a paper system of checks and vouchers. The conversion of the WIC program to EBT cards has automated a great deal of the process and provides better care for the children and mothers currently using WIC. The cards are similar to consumer credit/debit cards but are exclusively used for purchasing WIC-approved items.

=== Items provided ===
The food items provided by WIC are juice (single strength), milk, breakfast cereal, cheese, eggs, fruits and vegetables, whole wheat bread, whole grain items including brown rice and tortillas, canned fish (for exclusively breastfeeding mothers), legumes (dry/canned), and peanut butter. The program also provides tofu, soy milk, and medical foods for children and women with various metabolic or other diseases. Foods such as tortillas, brown rice, soy-based beverage, canned salmon, and a wide choice of fruits and vegetables are intended to provide state agencies flexibility in prescribing culturally appropriate food packages.

Organic fruits, vegetables, legumes and grains are covered under WIC while organic milk, cheese, juice, peanut butter and eggs are not covered under the program. Some organic forms of WIC-eligible foods (e.g., milk, eggs, cheese) meet the nutritional requirements set forth in WIC regulations and are therefore authorized. However, WIC state agencies are responsible for determining the brands and types of foods to authorize on their state WIC food lists. Some state agencies may allow organic foods on their foods lists, but this will vary by state. The decision may be influenced by a number of factors such as cost, product distribution within a state, and WIC participant acceptance.

=== WIC certification visits ===
In many state programs, for a WIC certification and health screening process, the staff advises parents to bring their child's immunization records. For some state programs, the screening and referral will occur at either client check-in, food instrument distribution, or during referral part of certification. They also provide the parents of their child's immunization status as well as provide educational materials on the different immunizations. For families in the community, local WIC agencies should be able to identify providers who offer immunizations in the community. At the state level, the WIC agencies can choose to document immunization screening and referrals, along with many other optional activities. These other activities include making appointments for immunizations, making copies of immunization records, entering immunization records into a registry, and providing other educational material.

== Funding ==
The WIC program is primarily funded through two separate federal grants: the food grant, and the nutrition services and administration (NSA) grant. Total funding increased from 2009 to 2011, but has since gradually decreased.

Fiscal Year	Food Grant	NSA Grant	Total Grant
2009	$5,095,205,056	$1,870,841,024	$6,966,046,080
2010	$4,991,019,755	$2,054,406,259	$7,045,426,014
2011	$5,118,743,586	$2,001,972,626	$7,120,716,212
2012	$5,125,579,756	$1,948,325,562	$7,073,905,318
2013	$4,896,354,042	$1,923,038,134	$6,819,392,176
2014	$4,910,706,206	$1,988,901,825	$6,899,608,031
2015	$4,681,239,224	$1,989,973,913	$6,671,213,137
2016	$4,602,436,831	$1,986,501,130	$6,588,937,961
2017	$4,498,522,258	$2,014,166,903	$6,512,689,161
2018	$3,861,173,185	$2,027,514,985	$5,888,688,170
2019	$3,632,937,477	$2,103,775,198	$5,736,712,675
2020	$3,662,909,460	$2,141,744,085	$5,804,653,545
2021	$3,731,441,344	$2,148,853,748	$5,880,295,092

The majority of WIC funding for state and local agencies comes from the federal government; however, some states find the need to supplement their funding with outside resources. In 2011, infant formula rebates generated $1.3 billion nationally.

=== Participation and budget trend ===
Since 1985, total participation in WIC steadily increased from 344,000 to a peak of almost 9.2 million in 2010. After 2010, participation began to drop as funding decreased and employment began to increase nationwide.

Fiscal Year	Total Participation (In Thousands)	Food (Millions)	NSA (Millions)	Total (Millions)	Average Monthly Food Costs per Person (Dollars)
2008	8,705	$4,534.0	$1,607.6	$6,188.8	$43.40
2009	9,122	$4,640.9	$1,788.0	$6,471.6	$42.40
2010	9,175	$4,562.8	$1,907.9	$6,689.9	$41.43
2011	8,961	$5,018.3	$1,961.3	$7,169.6	$46.69
2012	8,908	$4,808.5	$1,877.8	$6,797.8	$45.00
2013	8,663	$4,497.2	$1,881.6	$6,501.7	$43.26
2014	8,258	$4,324.4	$1,903.4	$6,356.4	$43.64
2015	8,024	$4,176.0	$1,921.9	$6,238.6	$43.37
2016	7,696	$3,949.6	$1,946.1	$6,018.9	$42.77
2017	7,286	$3,606.1	$1,964.8	$5,691.5	$41.24
2018	6,870	$3,376.6	$1,977.1	$5,433.6	$40.96
2019	6,396	$3,139.3	$1,986.4	$5,274.0	$40.90
2020	6,247	$2,884.4	$1,981.1	$4,992.2	$38.48
2021	6,243	$2,665.3	$2,000.2	$5,017.8	$35.57

Since 2008, WIC has seen a rise and fall in the amount of spending. From 2008 to 2011, the total amount spent on programs went from close to $6.2 billion to nearly $7.2 billion. In 2012, the amount spent began to fall to about $6.8 billion, possibly due to the decreasing number of participants.

== Literature review ==
=== Nutrition requirements ===
A woman, infant or child must meet two standards to be eligible to receive WIC benefits: (1) nutritional risk and (2) income disparity. Yet according to Peter Germanis and conservative AEI scholar Douglas J. Besharov in the SAGE Evaluations Review Journal, these two requirements often fall short in determining the real eligibility for WIC participants. They assert that the idea of "nutritional risk" is too broad of a concept. WIC's current definition of nutritional risk includes different medical conditions such as anemia and low or overweightness. The definition also includes the mother's history, age, past pregnancy complications, and inadequate diet.

While some of the nutritional risk standards are clear, Besharov and Germanis further point out that the majority of people on WIC do not clearly exhibit these symptoms or history. They still might have nutritional risk, but they do not meet the definition outlined in the policy. Despite the definition of nutrition risk, the Institute of Medicine's Committee on Scientific Evaluation of WIC Nutrition Risk Criteria pointed out that many states have used "generous" cut-off points and "loosely defined risk criteria." Their research concluded that because the judgment of nutritional risk is left up to the discretion of the doctor, many participants who only partly need WIC's assistance often take the spots of those with greater need.

In Feeding the Poor: Assessing Federal Food Aid, P.H. Rossi (1988) states that these gaps are often a result of unreliable tools or methods to measure nutrition risk, along with a lack of clarity in the definition of risk. In the study, Rossi took what are called "street-level bureaucrats" and applied them for WIC. These people were either at marginal or no nutrition risk, yet they were accepted easily into the WIC program. This practice essentially turns eligibility into solely a matter of income.

=== Income requirements ===
The second eligibility standard for participation in the WIC program—income level—also allows for much subjectivity. In theory, to qualify for WIC services, a family must have an income of no more than 185% of the current federal poverty level. While this definition seems straight forward, Besharov and Germanis describe many instances in which WIC participants with incomes above this level still received services. This could be due to the rapid growth of WIC in the past 30 years. Many WIC staff members have reported that because of the rise in funding, local income testing procedures have become less thorough (2000).

Besharov and Germanis aren't the only ones who have noticed discrepancies in the WIC income eligibility requirement. A USDA study demonstrated that 5.7% of WIC participants were not eligible because their income was too high (see U.S. General Accounting Office 1999, 23). Because of this evidence, the USDA believes that WIC can reduce funding and still meet the needs of those who truly are in need of assistance

Conversely, the same report explained that some members of the USDA have concluded that the current method for estimating eligibility is flawed and reports a much lower number of eligible citizens than actually exists. The method is flawed because it measures income on an annual basis instead of a monthly basis. When the researchers compared monthly income to annual income, they found that the number of income-eligible people increased dramatically a monthly evaluation level. (46-54% increase for infants, and 34-36% increase for older children. No mention of the effect on mothers was mentioned). They concluded that if income were measured monthly, then a larger number of families would be eligible to participate in WIC

Other research suggests that instead of redefining WIC eligibility requirements, policymakers should better advertise how lenient the requirements are. In a study published in 2005, Craig Gundersen, a professor in the Department of Nutritional Science at the University of Illinois at Urbana-Champaign, found that many parents stop using WIC funds to care for their children after their children reach the age of one year. However, over 35% of these children are in families that are below the poverty line. Only one in nine non-participating children nationwide are ineligible for WIC aid. The research suggests that parents are unaware that children up to five years of age are still eligible for WIC services; consequently, their children are not getting necessary nutrition.

To combat this phenomenon, Gundersen suggests that if policymakers want to reach those most in need, they need to target this group of people who were once on WIC and left, not new recipients. His research shows that families that have never received WIC assistance have monthly family incomes $797 higher than those who have left the program and $1,215 higher than those currently on the program. Clearly, the people who were once on WIC and left have greater need than most of those who have never sought WIC aid.

=== Other programs' effect ===
Eligibility for participation in the WIC program has been affected by a number of federal programs and policy changes since the 1980s. The federal government has gradually increased its control over WIC program policies, which has resulted in a move away from state program control. For instance, the nutritional risk criteria that had previously been instituted by the state cutoffs were standardized by the federal government in 1999.

In 1989, the Child Nutrition and WIC Reauthorization Act increased the amount of eligible program participants by allowing groups such as Medicaid, Aid to Families with Dependent Children (AFDC), Temporary Assistance for Needy Families (TANF), and those qualified for food stamps automatically became eligible for WIC assistance. Allowing these groups to be eligible, in effect, raised the income eligibility threshold for WIC services. Participants in the WIC program are now viewed as those that are inherently eligible because of an income at 185% below the poverty line or adjunctively eligible through eligibility and participation in the aforementioned programs. Research has identified an increase in health benefits among WIC program participants that could offset the additional costs of Medicaid in the future. Changes in welfare benefits are also estimated to increase the adjunctive eligibility rate.

1998, amendments to the Child Nutrition and WIC Reauthorization Act were made as well as amendments to the National School Lunch Act with respect to direct expenditures of agricultural commodities. A state was allowed to match federal funds for meals in private schools. Requirements to use certain WIC funds for the costs of nutrition services and administration were extended

WIC program participation can be affected by an introduction of new programs or changes to existing policy of programs that affect women, infants, and children. The WIC program assists 73 percent of eligible infants, 38 percent of eligible children, and 67 percent of eligible pregnant and postpartum women (Bitler & Scholz, 2002). If services increase under the TANF program, a specific segment of participants in the WIC program, such as infants, showed a decrease in participation. Implementation of the TANF program accounts for a 9.8 percent reduction in WIC program participation.

In addition to current programs that affect eligibility and participation in the WIC program, many states distribute waivers that extend program rules, change work requirements, and extend program timelines that affect eligibility and participation in WIC.

=== Internal programs' effect ===
WIC's impact is affected by internal programs. Some scholars assert that the spending structure needs to be adjusted so a greater number of eligible individuals can receive WIC services. Transferring some spending to other parts of the program is under consideration.

Besharov and Germanis argue that a sustained effort to make the program more effective should begin with a policy debate about WIC's role and impacts. "WIC's rigid spending rules, for example, prevent local programs from spending more than about 30 minutes for nutritional education every 6 months with clients." In the article "WIC Reauthorization: Opportunities for improving the Nutritional Status of Women, Infants, and Children (2002), authors Fox, McManus, and Schmidt from the George Washington University, say local WIC agencies are required to make nutrition education available to participants at least twice in each six-month certification period. The initial nutritional session is usually conducted during the intake appointment with the individual, and subsequent sessions are typically offered in a group format lasting about 10 to 15 minutes. These education sessions are optional than mandatory (2003). This practice raises questions about the efficiency of WIC spending. People doubt the legitimacy of the 30-minute nutritional education since it is too short to play a part in improving the participant's nutritional status. Therefore, it is reasonable to ask: Would it be more effective and efficient if the spending for this session is transferred to other useful areas?

Based on the data mentioned by Alison Jacknowitz from American University and Laura Tiehen from the U.S. Department of Agriculture in their article "Transitions into and out of the WIC Program: A Cause for Concern?", in 2002 the average retail value of the WIC food benefit for infants ages 4–12 months was $100.37 per month; the average retail value of the child food benefit was $39.29 per month (Institute of Medicine, 2006). The higher retail value of the WIC food benefit for infants is due to the inclusion of infant formula. Since the WIC program encourages breast feeding, it raises a question similar to the foregoing: Would it be more effective and efficient if some of the spending on infant formula is transferred to drawing more participation of WIC, making more people eligible for this program?

=== Food package ===
Participants of WIC receive checks, vouchers, or electronic cards to purchase food at participating retail markets each month to supplement their diets. The program food package is designed to address the specific needs of low-income pregnant, breastfeeding, and postpartum non-breastfeeding women; infants; and children up to five years of age who are nutritionally at risk.

The food purchased with WIC vouchers must be on the approved list of approved foods. Up until 2005, the list of approved foods was meant to help supplement participant's diets to contain the following priority nutrients: protein, calcium, iron, and vitamins A and C. The literature stated that from the initiation of WIC in 1972 until 2005, the monthly food packages provided by WIC remained largely unchanged despite advances in nutrition knowledge, changes in dietary patterns, increased cultural diversity among WIC participants, and a nationwide epidemic of obesity.

Nationwide data showed that WIC participants had inadequate intake of vitamin E, magnesium, calcium, potassium, and fiber while using the original food packages. Participants also had an excessive intake of saturated fats, sodium, zinc, and preformed vitamin A.

In response to the lack of intended program outcomes, the U.S. Department of Agriculture's Food and Nutrition Service assigned the Institute of Medicine's Committee to assess the effectiveness of the food package content. As part of the evaluation, they were to determine the special dietary needs of each subgroup of the WIC participants. This included prioritizing the targeted nutrient intake and offering recommendations for specific changes to the WIC food packages. To do this, the committee was charged with making recommendations that were "culturally suitable, non-burdensome to administration, efficient for nationwide distribution and vendor checkout, and cost-neutral." These recommendations were implemented in the form of supplemental foods that would counteract the deficiencies and excesses of the WIC food package within the bounds of cost and cultural requirements. This change to the food package was done again in 2009, which put the food package in compliance with the 2005 Dietary Guideline for Americans. This change introduced an inclusion of cash-value vouchers for fruits, vegetables, whole-wheat bread, corn or whole-wheat tortillas, brown rice, oats, bulgur, and barley. Milk purchase options were also altered to only include lower-fat milk for all women and all children over two years of age. The adjustment in the food package had a significant effect on participant nutrition.

The literature suggested that there has been a significant increase in the overall nutrition of WIC participants as a result of these food package changes. Participants were surveyed before and after the new food package implementations. The data showed that there was a 17.3 percentage point increase in whole wheat consumption and a 7.2 percentage point increase in the amount of vegetables consumed.

Currently, WIC food packages include infant cereal, iron-fortified adult cereal, fruit rich in vitamin C, vegetable juice, eggs, milk, cheese, peanut butter, beans, and fish. WIC has recently expanded this list to also include soy-based beverages, tofu, baby foods, whole-wheat bread, and a variety of fruits and vegetables.

The literature painted a clear picture of the improvements that have been made and the effect the food package change has made in increasing the nutrition of WIC participants. The literature was also helpful in giving a clear blueprint for future changes in the WIC program including specialty committees, data collection on health effects, food selection, implementation, surveying for effectiveness. Future changes to the food package will be evaluated in the same ways and data will be compared.

=== National savings in healthcare costs ===
WIC has dramatically reduced healthcare costs by (a) providing prenatal services, and (b) promoting breastfeeding. Several controlled evaluations have shown that women who receive prenatal WIC services have lower hospital costs for both them and their infants than women who did not receive WIC services. In 1992, prenatal WIC enrollment was estimated to have reduced first year medical costs for U.S. infants by $1.19 billion, more than offsetting the government's cost of WIC.

Prenatal use of WIC services also decreases the odds of having a low birth-weight newborn by 25 percent and reduces very low birth-weight births by 44 percent. Having a higher birth-weight newborn has the potential to decrease costs for hospitalization in the first year, since infants with lower birth-weight have higher costs for initial hospitalization and higher re-hospitalization costs. Every dollar spent on prenatal WIC benefits resulted in a savings of $0.93 for the Federal Government, $0.77 for State governments, and an additional $1.37 for private payers, hospitals, and insurers' ($3.07 total) costs. Because of these savings, WIC is often cited as being one of the most cost-effective food assistance programs in the nation.

One reason that WIC is known as being cost-effective is explained in a study done in 1993 by Debbie Montgomery and Patricia Splett where they showed that promotion of breast-feeding in the WIC program is an effective cost-containment action. The study revealed that WIC users who exclusively breastfed their children during the first six months of the child's life incurred a savings of $112 in Medicaid costs per infant. The average pharmacy payments were $29.82 lower for males and $12.16 lower for females who were breast-fed.

=== Research problems and limitations ===
Historically, WIC has been portrayed as an efficient and effective use of taxpayer dollars. Finding or conducting research that conclusively proves that portrayal is somewhat difficult. Two challenges exist, finding research that encompasses all areas of WIC and conducting scientific research.

Research on WIC tends to focus on the help provided to pregnant women and newborns. The research on this part of WIC shows that the help provided is effective and the system is efficient. These results are then used to determine that all of the WIC programs are effective. The problematic part is that the services provided to pregnant women and newborns only account for 12% of the program. There are precious few studies that examine the effectiveness and efficiency of the other 88% of WIC.

Conducting scientific research on an aid program like WIC is also problematic. First, it is difficult, if not impossible, to establish a control group. To do so would require a researcher to take people asking for aid and then split them into two groups. Aid would then need to be denied to one of the groups. This would be unethical. Second, it is difficult to account for other variables that could affect infant and children health, in addition to the help provided by WIC. An example would be parental motivation. How do you determine if the results of WIC were because of the program or due to effective parenting? More effective parents may be more likely to seek WIC help earlier and longer. That may be the real reason for success rather than how the program is delivered.

=== Future challenges ===
According to Food & Nutrition Services (FNS), WIC is one of the nation's most successful and cost-effective nutrition intervention programs. In spite of its success, the WIC program, as with any program that involves coordination and communication between many people, faces challenges in delivering nutrition services, such as the coordination of its nutrition services with changing health and welfare programs. Welfare reform increases demands on WIC management in performing outreach and coordination. New health challenges include the "obesity epidemic". The demography of the low-income population that the WIC program serves is constantly changing. Retention of staff, employment of paraprofessionals, and the allocation of resources for staff training are additional challenges, along with the use of information technology to assess the effect of nutrition services and to enhance service delivery and program management within the limits of program funding.

In the light of the above challenges, the United States General Accounting Office (GAO) did research and made recommendations to USDA that would help it to identify strategies that will address WIC's challenges in recruiting and retaining a skilled staff and assessing the effects of nutrition services. It was recommended that:

- USDA should work with Economic Research Service and the National Association of WIC Directors to conduct an assessment of the staffing needs of state and local WIC agencies. This assessment should examine factors such as staffing patterns, vacancies, salaries, benefits, duties, turnover, and retention.
- USDA should work with the Economic Research Service, the National Association of WIC Directors, and other stakeholders, including the CDC, to develop a strategic plan to evaluate the impacts of specific WIC nutrition services. This plan should include information on the types of research that could be done to evaluate the impacts of specific nutrition services as well as the data and the financial resources that are needed.

== See also ==
- California WIC program
