= Healthy, Hunger-Free Kids Act of 2010 =

Federal statute

- Long title: To reauthorize child nutrition programs, and for other purposes.
- Enacted by: the 111th United States Congress
- Effective: December 13, 2010

Citations
- Public law: Pub. L. 111–296 (text) (PDF)

Legislative history
- Introduced in the Senate as S. 3307 by Blanche Lincoln (D-AR) on May 5, 2010; Committee consideration by Agriculture, Nutrition, and Forestry; Passed the Senate on August 5, 2010 (voice vote); Passed the House on December 2, 2010 (264–157); Signed into law by President Barack Obama on December 13, 2010

The Healthy, Hunger-Free Kids Act of 2010 (Pub. L. 111–296 (text) (PDF)) is a federal statute signed into law by President Barack Obama on December 13, 2010. The law part of the reauthorization of funding for child nutrition (see the original Child Nutrition Act). It funded child nutrition programs and free lunch programs in schools for 5 years. In addition, the law set new nutrition standards for schools, and allocated $4.5 billion for their implementation. The new nutrition standards were a centerpiece of First Lady Michelle Obama's Let's Move! initiative to combat childhood obesity. In FY 2011, federal spending totaled $10.1 billion for the National School Lunch Program. The Healthy, Hunger-Free Kids Act allows USDA, for the first time in 30 years, opportunity to make real reforms to the school lunch and breakfast programs by improving the critical nutrition and hunger safety net for millions of children. Healthy, Hunger-Free Kids Act and Michelle Obama were a step in transforming the food pyramid recommendation, which has been around since the early 1990s, into what is now known as "MyPlate".

According to the U.S. Department of Agriculture, for the 2012–13 school year, 21.5 million American children received free lunch or reduced-price lunch at school. Across the U.S., the school lunch program varies by state.

In December 2018, the USDA weakened the ability to enforce the Act.

== Legislative history ==
The bill was introduced in the US Senate by Blanche Lincoln (D-AR), Chairwoman of the Senate Agriculture Committee. It was later approved by the Senate by unanimous voice vote on August 5, 2010. In the U.S. House of Representatives, the Healthy, Hunger-Free Kids Act passed a by a vote of 264–157. President Barack Obama signed the bill into law on December 13, 2010. The Healthy, Hunger-Free Kids Act took effect in 2014. Senators Charles Schumer (D-NY) and Kirsten Gillibrand (D-NY) pushed for Greek yogurt, much of which is manufactured in Utica, New York, to be included in the regulations determining acceptable proteins to be served at school.

As of September 30th, 2015, the act has expired and has not been renewed. However, the programs created and modified by the initial act continue to run. As stated by the initial bill, the programs themselves do not have a set expiration date. However, they will need to be reauthorized before they are allowed to receive continual funding. The initial funds of $4.5 billion from the act were set to continue for a decade after the bill was passed, ending in 2020.

== Provisions ==
The Healthy, Hunger-Free Kids Act allows the U.S. Department of Agriculture (USDA) to make significant changes to the school lunch program for the first time in over 30 years. In addition to funding standard child nutrition and school lunch programs, there are several new nutritional standards in the bill. The main aspects are listed below.

=== Community Eligibility ===
Community Eligibility is a provision (SEC. 104) that allows schools that meet the eligibility requirement to serve free meals to all students without collecting household applications. If at least 40% of students participate in programs such as Supplemental Nutrition Assistance Program and Temporary Assistance for Needy Families a school can be eligible.

== New food standards ==
- Gives the USDA the authority to set new standards for food sold in lunches during the regular day, including vending machines.
- Authorizes additional funds for the new standards for federally-subsidized school lunches.
- Provides resources for schools and communities to utilize local farms and gardens to provide fresh produce.
- Provides resources to increase nutritional quality of food provided by the USDA.
- Sets minimum standards for school wellness policies.
- Limits milk served to nonfat flavored milk or 1 percent white milk.
- Reduced portion sizes in meals.
- Mandate a minimum on fruit, vegetables, and whole grain servings.
- Mandate a maximum sodium, sugar, and fat content.

=== Increases access ===
- Increased the number of eligible children for school meal programs by 115,000.
- Uses census data to determine student need in high-poverty areas, rather than relying on paper applications.
- Authorizes the USDA to provide meals in more after-school programs in "high-risk" areas.
- Increases access to drinking water in schools.

=== Program monitoring ===
- Requires school districts to be audited every 3 years to see if they have met nutrition standards.
- Requires easier access for students and parents about nutritional facts of meals.
- Improves recall procedures for school food.
- Provides training for school lunch providers.

== Criticism ==
In September 2012, students at Wallace High School in Sharon Springs, Kansas uploaded a video to YouTube complaining about students being hungry and not fed well enough to participate in their extracurricular activities or sports due to reduced portion sizes relative to those prior to the new law. The video drew national attention and eventually garnered over 1.7 million views. In response to viewing the video, nutrition specialists explained that before the new standards were implemented, some schools may have been serving higher amounts of protein than were nutritionally needed so that customers were kept happy. The experts also explained that eating 850 calories at lunch is enough for most high schoolers. Along with the viral video, students reached out on other forms of social media by using the hashtag 'ThanksMichelleObama'. Sam Kass, the executive director of Let's Move! and senior policy adviser for Nutrition, shared "We've seen the photos being tweeted, but we don't dictate the food that schools serve – school districts do."

A study done by Harvard School of Public Health discovered that about 60 percent of vegetables and roughly 40 percent of fresh fruit in schools are thrown away due to no interest. A University of Vermont study found that the amount of food students did not eat but threw away instead increased by 56 percent after the implementation of the Healthy, Hunger-Free Kids Act. However, a 2014 Harvard School of Public Health study found that food waste had not increased by a measurable percentage as a result of the Healthy, Hunger-Free Kids Act. One of the biggest points of criticism for Healthy, Hunger-Free Kids Act is meal participation, and that participation had decreased. The program has declined by nearly 4 percent and some schools have lost revenue due to the decline in participation, therefore, many are choosing to opt out of the program as a whole.

=== Higher costs ===
As stated previously, higher costs and loss of revenue were among the criticism that the Healthy, Hunger-Free Kids Act of 2010 faced. With the act changing the nutritional requirements of the National School Lunch Program, schools would need to pay more in order to meet them— a concern brought up by a professor at the University of Illinois in 2014. Additionally, if more students were to opt out of the program due to a dislike of the new standards, this would result in less meals being sold, thereby leading to a loss of money. CBS News and the National Library of Medicine (NLM) bring up similar concerns, where several superintendents and schools stated that their districts had a drop in lunch sales within a year of the act's implementation. Some districts lost $30,000, or a 10-12% drop in comparison to the previous year, while others lost $30,000 in the first three months following the new changes. While the 2016 NLM article by Cohen et al. finds that the participation increases by the second year, the schools were still left worried over possible revenue loss.

In 2024, 14 years after the act's passage, the problems still persist for some. While relatively agreed upon that the overall quality of meals has improved, costs still remain a concern. Mississippi State University student newspaper writer Teirrah Tidwell interviewed the state director in charge of the nutritional programs for children in Mississippi, who expanded on the financial struggles the systems have faced. Specifically, the director commented on how there are few manufacturers that provide for the schools, as the nutrition requirements are specific. This has resulted in higher costs due to less competition from suppliers. He mentions that this was especially prominent during the COVID-19 pandemic where there was less available food on the market that fit the set requirements.

In response to the criticism, the USDA issued modified standards which were intended to be more flexible.

=== Whole milk ===
A number of dairy farmers advocated for the reintroduction of whole milk in schools. The statute gave the USDA the authority to set new nutritional standards for all foods sold in schools, not just those included in the National School Lunch Program. As a result, the USDA FNS introduced new meal pattern requirements and nutritional specifications (i.e. 7 CFR 210.10) in January 2012 stating that if milk is served, it must be fat-free (unflavored or flavored) or low-fat (unflavored). This effectively phased out the serving of whole milk in schools, as it typically contains more than 2% fat. These changes were based on recommendations from the Institute of Medicine and the 2010 Dietary Guidelines for Americans, which suggested that children should consume less saturated fat, which is found in higher amounts in whole milk compared to low-fat or non-fat milk. In 2026, the Whole Milk for Healthy Kids Act reversed the policy.

=== Later modifications ===
The new modified standards have also been brought into question. These concerns were on either the change implemented in 2018 or the proposed changes in 2020. In a 2020 JAMA (Journal of the American Medical Association) study by Kinderknecht et al., they looked to see if there was a difference in the quality of the school lunches of those who participated in the National School Lunch Program and those who did not (the National School Lunch Program had their quality requirement's changed following the act). While the study yielded positive results, they mention that their study did not include the new changes in policies (flexibility in consumption grains, sodium, and flavored milk) or the newly proposed rule (the lowered variety of vegetables). They stated that they are unsure if the quality of foods will remain the same following the alteration of the quality standards. As such, uncertainty and concern for the effectiveness rose following the act's modifications.

In a similar manner the Food, Research, and Action Center, spoke up about both the 2018 change and the 2020 proposed rule change to the nutritional standards. In terms of the original modification in 2018, they believed that the flexibility had reversed the intended effect of the act. When it comes to the new 2020 proposal, they do not support the grain standard change of 100% whole-grain-rich to 50%. They stated it may reduce the fiber and whole grain intake that low-income students who do not consume enough grain, need to consume.

== Success ==
The Healthy, Hunger-Free Kids Act provides meals to children that normally could not afford those nutritious food items. It also allows schools to have more resources that they may not have had before. A study in Virginia and Massachusetts concluded that children in schools were eating significantly healthier meals when their parents or guardians were not choosing their food, but the school was. While looking at the nutrition value of 1.7 million meals selected by 7,200 students in three middle and three high schools in an urban school district in Washington state, where the data was collected and compared in the 16 months before the standards were carried out with data collected in the 15 months after implementation; the information found that there was an increase in six nutrients: fiber, iron, calcium, vitamin A, vitamin C, and protein. While providing new meals with improvements in fruits, vegetables, amount of variety, and portion sizes, the calorie intake has also transformed. The energy density ration was 1.65 before Healthy, Hunger-Free Kids Act compared to the new number of 1.44 after.

Several years after the act's implementation, many entities share the same sentiment that the act was likely effective in increasing food quality and reducing obesity rates in children. In some cases, they would look at the dietary intake before and after the passage of the act. Meanwhile, in others, they observed noticeable changes in BMI (the scale to determine obesity) prior to and following the passage of the Healthy, Hunger-Free Kids Act of 2010.

=== Dietary ===
To discover whether dietary changes were made, a JAMA study by Kinderknecht et al. compared the meals of students ages 5–18 who participated in the lunch programs prior to the implementation of the act and following it. After measuring the quality via the Healthy Eating Index-2010, they concluded that the scores post-policy were higher. This meant that the tested schools adhered to the new dietary guidelines, likely indicating a better dietary quality for students under the program.

In 2020, Cohen and Schwartz compiled documents that marked the success of the act. In it, a study by Gearan and Fox discovered improved quality of food in many categories. Following the grading of the Healthy Eating Index-2010, they saw a rise in the total score, meaning a positive change was observed. There was a larger consumption of fruits, vegetables, dairy, and whole grains, while a reduction in refined grains and sodium. This led them to conclude that the new standards from the act led to higher dietary quality meals.

The Food, Research, and Action Center also deemed the act as successful. The organization included the improvement in food quality as one of the wins of the Healthy, Hunger-Free Kids Act of 2010. They mentioned how the new standards increased the amount of healthy foods, ranging from fruits and vegetables to whole grain. Additionally, they noted how the act had put limits on calories, saturated fats, sodium, and fatty milk. Therefore, to The Food, Research, and Action Center, the act was successful in improving children's diet.

=== Body Mass Index ===
In 2020, a JAMA Network study conducted by Richardson et al. discovered that those who took part in the National School Lunch Program prior to the act displayed higher chances of progressing to higher body mass index scores, when compared to those who did not participate. That is, the group looked to see whether the increase in BMI scores would be reduced following the enactment of the statute. From their results, they discovered that reaching high BMI scores due to the lunch program was less likely following the act. Their conclusions provide evidence in support of the positive changes brought about by the Healthy, Hunger-Free Kids Act of 2010.

In another study conducted at Northwestern University, school lunch programs were discovered to no longer be correlated with increased BMI scores following the implementation of the act in 2012. The study found evidence suggesting that the nutritional quality standards —which leads to more nutritional food— contributed to less childhood obesity. This meant that in the case of this study, the positive correlation between the school lunches and obesity was no longer apparent following the Healthy, Hunger-free Kids Act of 2010.

== Flexibility ==
On December 6, 2018, US Secretary of Agriculture Sonny Perdue announced a new rule which froze the Act's progressively lowering limits on sodium, while also allowing for the sale of 1% flavored milks and fewer whole grain-rich foods in school breakfast and school lunch options.

In 2020, the federal government considered modifying the programs made by the Healthy, Hunger-Free Kids Act of 2010 by offering even further flexibility. That is, the rule proposed allowing schools to reduce the variety of vegetables as long as the quantity of daily and weekly vegetables quantities remained consistent. In hopes of increasing legume consumption, legumes —considered an alternative to meat— would also be counted towards both the meat and vegetable group's weekly requirement.
