= Summer lunch programs in public libraries =

Many public libraries in North America offer summer meal programs to keep kids fed throughout the day. In the summer, low-income children may require nutrition away from home. If parents are at work, and there are limited food sources at home, children have fewer options for healthy, balanced meals. Coupled with programming or interactive activities, library meal programs are providing children with healthy lunches and opportunities for learning.

== USDA Program and libraries ==
Food insecurity occurs when children or adults are deprived of food and nutrition. 22 million children in the United States qualify for free and reduced meals. During summer break, these 22 million children need to be able to access adequate sources of nutrition.

The United States Department of Agriculture's (USDA) Summer Food Service Program (SFSP), provides meals to low-income children throughout the country in areas where at least 50% of children qualify for free or reduced lunches. Lunches are offered to children up to the age of 18.

Actual lunch components include: milk, a meat or meat alternative, and a serving of vegetable and fruits.

=== Research ===
Research shows that there are three major risks for low-income students over the summer: weight gain/obesity, food insecurity, and summer learning loss.

Dubbed as the summer slide, middle-class children lose an average of two months of reading achievement over the summer, but low-income students lose even more. For every one line a child from a lower socioeconomic status reads, a child from a higher socioeconomic status will read three. Compared with middle-class peers, low-income students have a harder time re-learning material at the beginning of the school year. This phenomenon is known as the achievement gap.

Public libraries fight the achievement gap in two ways—providing food and providing learning opportunities.

The following conducted studies reaffirm that library or related learning, and nutrition are effective for children.

The Dominican Study

Over three years, a study was conducted to see if children entering fourth grade who participated in library summer reading programs performed better at the beginning of the school year. Results concluded that participants in the study either maintained or increased reading skills.

Summer Food Service Program Study

A study examined nutrients in SFSP lunches versus lunches served at home to low-income children in West Virginia. The results determined that SFSP lunches overall provided more nutrition, but could use improvement (calcium levels).

Health and Academic Achievement Study

A health study observed 5th-6th graders from 12 schools in an urban district of Connecticut. The study compared BMI levels, standardized test scores, age, race, sex, and eligibility for free and reduced lunch. The study found that students with more health assets (positive health indicators) performed better on tests.

Parent Poll

A study of parents and libraries found that 76% of lower income parents rank free programs at the library as “very important” compared to 58% of parents (earning $50,000/year or more). This data shows it is relevant to host summer lunch in the library because it is already valued and trusted in the community.
