= California WIC program =

Californian government assistance program

California has, by far, the largest WIC program in the nation. It is a program of the California Department of Public Health which administers contracts with 84 local agencies – half local governments and half private, non-profit community organizations – which serve 1.46 million participants at 650 local sites statewide (The majority of participants are Latino (78%), Caucasian (8%), African-American (5.5%), Asian (5%), and Native American (<1%)), with FY 2010 food expenditures of $827 million and nutrition services and administration expenditures of $304 million.

== Organizational structure ==
The Department of Health Services WIC Branch is in charge of administering all WIC funds. It allocates the funds to local agencies. Agencies receive about $100/year per participant enrolled for nutrition services and administrative expenditures (exclusive of the food budget); thus an agency serving 25,000 participants receives approximately $2,500,000 from the state to run all services related to nutrition services and administration of the program.

Approximately 3,000 local WIC staff members assess and document program eligibility based on residency, income, and health or nutrition risk, and issue 7 million food checks each month. Each check is valid for a 30-day period and is payable for a specific type and quantity of food. The retail value of the checks is about $60 per month per participant.

A local WIC site – whether a permanent clinic, a small storefront, or a folding table in a firehouse or church basement – is a fixture of nearly every small town, low-income neighborhood, and reservation in California. Local WIC agencies run WIC sites which are also called clinics. WIC agencies are evenly divided between those based in 48 county public health programs and 52 non-profit providers, some of which operate programs in more than one county. However, non-profit contractors serve the majority of WIC participants in the state. Local agencies range in size from small rural or neighborhood sites serving less than 1,000 to large urban agencies, such as one with a caseload of 316,825 participants, dwarfing most state WIC agencies.

== History/Special Interest Groups ==
California followed the basic federal WIC regulations until the early 1990s, when the state’s program spending suddenly spiked. This sudden increase in WIC involvement and spending occurred because two major stakeholders began influencing California WIC policy: the California Rural Legal Assistance Foundation (CRLA) and the California WIC Association. The individual efforts of these two organizations broadened the user base for WIC and pushed forward further welfare legislation within the state.

CRLA is a nonprofit organization created to give legal services to migrant workers and other impoverished peoples in California who cannot afford legal aid. Founded in 1966, the organization’s mission is to “strive for economic justice and human rights on behalf of California's rural poor”. As part of a national study, in 1991 the CRLA conducted a Community Childhood Hunger Identification Project (CHHIP). CHHIP researchers discovered that 52 percent of migrant workers surveyed were not on WIC because they did not think they were eligible. The CRLA recommended that the California WIC program be expanded to include all eligible women and children in the state, even undocumented migratory workers.

In the report’s concluding statements, researcher Gail Feenstra said, “The choice is ours: hunger can either be alleviated and prevented, or allowed to fester. If we do not invest in prevention, we will pay a much higher price in the years ahead.” The organization argued that although this would cause a tax increase for Californians, in the long run the increased WIC costs would combat extreme costs through other welfare programs like MediCal. They reasoned that if the impoverished are not malnourished as children, then when they grow up they will avoid many of the health problems that would force them to turn to welfare as adults.

In 1992, just after the CRLA released this report, WIC agencies throughout the state banded together to create the California WIC Association (CalWIC). According to its website, this nonprofit organization “represents all parties interested in the operation of the Special Supplemental Nutrition Program for Women, Infants, and Children (WIC)”. Since its creation, CalWIC has actively supported legislation that improves the quality of the WIC program. It campaigns for additional WIC funding and attempts to organize WIC beneficiaries into action.
