= Healthy Meals for Healthy Americans Act of 1994 =

- Long title: An Act to amend the Child Nutrition Act of 1966 and the National School Lunch Act to promote healthy eating habits for children and to extend certain authorities contained in such Acts through fiscal year 1998, and for other purposes.
- Enacted by: the 103rd United States Congress

Citations
- Public law: Pub. L. 103-448
- Statutes at Large: 108 Stat. 4699

Legislative history
- Introduced in the Senate as S. 1614 by Patrick Leahy on November 2, 1993; Signed into law by President Bill Clinton on November 2, 1994

The Healthy Meals for Healthy Americans Act of 1994 (P.L. 103-448) reauthorized several expiring programs under the National School Lunch Act (P.L. 79-396, as amended; 42 U.S.C. 1751 et seq.) and Child Nutrition Amendments of 1966 (P.L. 89-642) through FY1998. Required that federally subsidized meal programs conform their meal requirements to the Dietary Guidelines for Americans, permanently authorized the nutrition education and training program and made it an entitlement, and expanded the outreach and coordination of WIC. Subsequently, P.L. 104-193 restored NET to discretionary status and to a multi-year authorization rather than a permanent authorization.

This law was superseded by William F. Goodling Child Nutrition Reauthorization Act of 1998 (P.L. 105-336).

== See also ==
- Institute of Child Nutrition
