= Institute of Child Nutrition =

Federally funded national center dedicated to child nutrition

The Institute of Child Nutrition (ICN), formerly known as the National Food Service Management Institute (NFSMI), is a Mississippi-based, federally funded national center dedicated to child nutrition. Established in 1989, the Institute conducts applied research, develops training materials, provides training, and serves as a clearinghouse of information for professionals within federally assisted child nutrition programs. It is located within the School of Applied Sciences at the University of Mississippi. The Institute, authorized by Congress under Section 21 of the Richard B. Russell National School Lunch Act (79 Pub.L. 396, 60 Stat. 230), is funded by a grant administered through the U.S. Department of Agriculture (USDA), Food and Nutrition Service (FNS).

== History ==
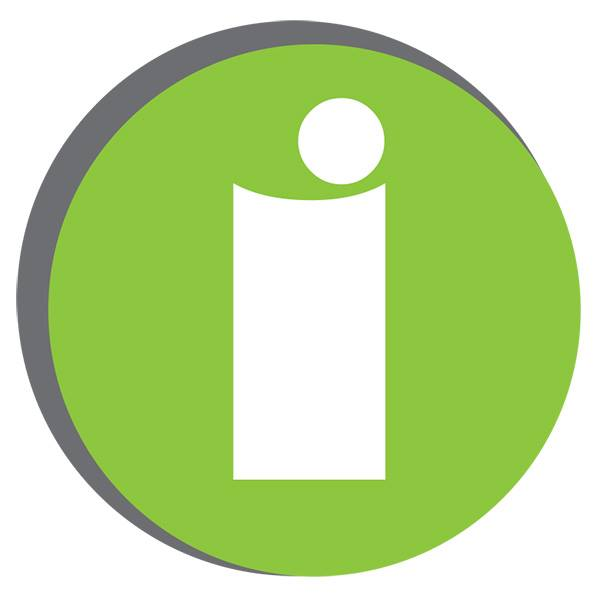
ICN Logo

The Child Nutrition and WIC Reauthorization Act of 1989 (PL 101-147, Nov. 10, 1989), signed into law by President George H. W. Bush, established the National Food Service Management Institute (NFSMI), which would later become the Institute of Child Nutrition.

The Healthy Meals for Healthy Americans Act of 1994 (PL 103-448, Dec. 8, 1994) permanently reauthorized the Institute of Child Nutrition.

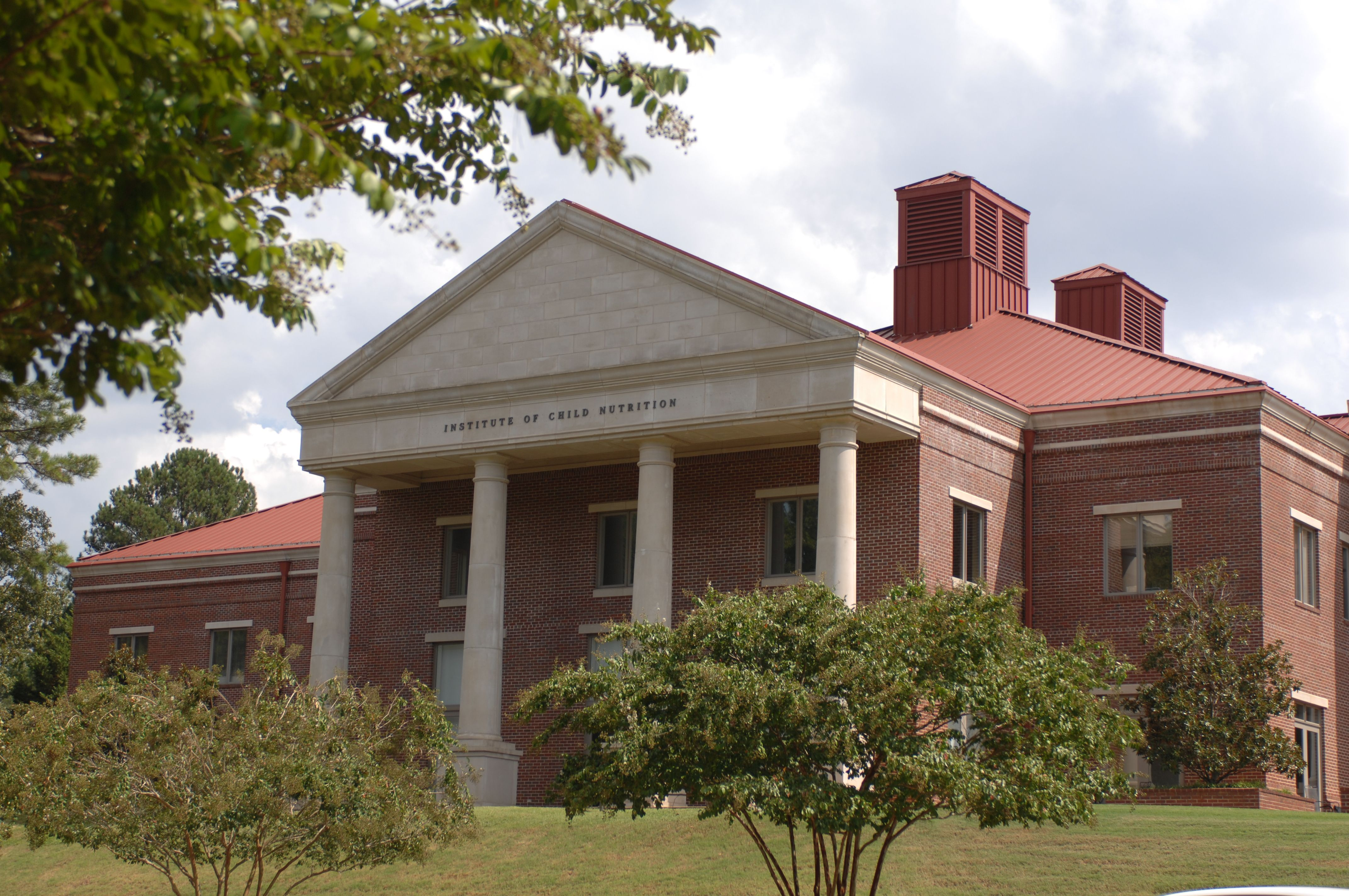
R. Gerald Turner Hall, the Institute of Child Nutrition headquarters, located on the University of Mississippi Campus.

On March 27, 1998, the Institute held a ceremony to break ground for a new building on the University of Mississippi campus in Oxford, MS. On March 23, 2001, construction was completed, and the NFSMI building was dedicated. On February 16, 2007, the NFSMI building was designated R. Gerald Turner Hall in honor of the former University of Mississippi chancellor, who worked alongside Executive Director Dr. Josephine Martin to secure funding for the new building.

The Child Nutrition Archives was established at the Institute under the 2003 Grant agreement with the USDA. The Archives preserves the history of various child nutrition programs by preserving manuscript collections, photograph collections, and oral history interviews among child nutrition professionals.

The National Food Service Management Institute changed its name to the Institute of Child Nutrition on July 1, 2015, in order to more accurately represent the Institution's mission to the general public. The headquarters of the Institute is located at the University of Mississippi, with the Applied Research Division located at the University of Southern Mississippi.

== See also ==
- Child and Adult Care Food Program
- Child Nutrition Act
- Share Our Strength
