= Whole Milk for Healthy Kids Act of 2025 =

Federal statute

- Long title: An Act to amend the Richard B. Russell National School Lunch Act to allow schools that participate in the school lunch program to serve whole milk, and for other purposes.
- Enacted by: the 119th United States Congress
- Sponsored by: Roger Marshall (R-KS)
- Number of co-sponsors: 16

Citations
- Public law: Pub. L. 119–69
- Statutes at Large: 139 Stat. 1997

Codification
- Acts affected: Richard B. Russell National School Lunch Act; Child Nutrition Act of 1966
- Titles affected: 42 U.S.C.
- U.S.C. sections affected: 42 U.S.C. § 1758; 42 U.S.C. § 1762a; 42 U.S.C. § 1769b; 42 U.S.C. § 1776
- Agencies affected: United States Department of Agriculture

Legislative history
- Introduced in the Senate as S. 222 by Roger Marshall (R-KS) on January 23, 2025; Committee consideration by Agriculture, Nutrition, and Forestry; Passed the Senate on November 20, 2025 (Unanimous consent); Passed the House on December 15, 2025 (Voice vote); Signed into law by President Donald Trump on January 14, 2026

The Whole Milk for Healthy Kids Act of 2025 is a federal law that amended the Richard B. Russell National School Lunch Act to expand the types of milk and nondairy beverages that schools may offer through the National School Lunch Program. Introduced by Senator Roger Marshall of Kansas on January 23, 2025, as S. 222, the bill passed the Senate by unanimous consent on November 20, 2025, and the United States House of Representatives by voice vote on December 15. President Donald Trump signed it into law on January 14, 2026, as Public Law 119-69.

Participating schools may now serve whole, reduced-fat (2%), low-fat (1%), and fat-free milk, in flavored or unflavored varieties. The law also revises requirements for nondairy alternatives and milk substitutions for students with disabilities. Other provisions exclude milk fat from certain saturated fat calculations for school meals and add food allergy information to training requirements for school food service personnel.

== Background ==
The National School Lunch Program, established in 1946, has included milk among the foods provided through federally funded school meals. Federal requirements governing the types of milk served have changed over time in response to developments in nutrition policy.

The Healthy, Hunger-Free Kids Act of 2010 introduced stricter nutritional standards for school meals. Under subsequent USDA regulations, participating schools were generally limited to serving low-fat and fat-free milk beginning in the 2011–2012 school year. Both flavored and unflavored varieties remained permitted.

The restrictions were intended to bring school meals into closer alignment with the Dietary Guidelines for Americans and reduce saturated fat consumption. They became a subject of debate among lawmakers, dairy industry representatives, and advocates of greater flexibility in school meal programs.

Introduced in 2025, the Whole Milk for Healthy Kids Act sought to expand the range of milk available through the program. It also addressed nondairy alternatives, dietary accommodations for students with disabilities, and food allergy training for school nutrition personnel.

== Provisions ==
The act amended the Richard B. Russell National School Lunch Act and the Child Nutrition Act of 1966. Its provisions concern permitted milk varieties, nondairy substitutions, saturated fat calculations, and training requirements for school food service personnel.

=== Milk options in school lunches ===
Schools participating in the National School Lunch Program may serve whole, reduced-fat (2%), low-fat (1%), and fat-free milk. Both flavored and unflavored varieties are permitted, including organic and nonorganic milk.

The expanded options reverse the restrictions introduced following the Healthy, Hunger-Free Kids Act of 2010, which had limited milk served through the program to low-fat and fat-free varieties beginning in the 2011–2012 school year.

Serving whole milk is not mandatory. Individual school food authorities retain discretion over which permitted varieties they provide, subject to applicable federal requirements.

=== Nondairy milk alternatives ===
Schools may offer nondairy beverages that meet USDA nutritional standards for milk substitutes, including requirements for calcium, protein, vitamin A, and vitamin D.

Qualifying beverages may be made available to all students. When schools adopt this approach, students requesting them for reasons unrelated to a disability do not need to submit individual written requests.

Schools that do not offer these alternatives to all students remain subject to the applicable procedures for providing substitutions upon request. The law does not require participating schools to provide plant-based beverages.

=== Milk substitutions for students with disabilities ===
The act revises the documentation requirements for milk substitutions provided to students with disabilities. Previously, schools generally required a written statement from a licensed medical professional identifying the disability and specifying an appropriate dietary substitute.

Under the amended requirements, a parent or legal guardian may provide the written statement. This allows families to request dietary accommodations without relying exclusively on documentation from a medical professional.

=== Saturated fat requirements ===
The law changes how saturated fat from fluid milk is counted when determining whether school lunches meet federal nutritional standards. Milk fat is excluded from the calculation of saturated fat content under the National School Lunch Program.

Previously, school lunches were subject to limits on average saturated fat content over a school week. The exclusion allows schools to disregard saturated fat contributed by fluid milk when calculating compliance with the applicable limit. Other federal nutritional requirements, including those concerning calories and sodium, remain in effect.

=== Food allergy training ===
An amendment to the Child Nutrition Act of 1966 adds food allergy information to training requirements for local school food service personnel.

The provision covers the prevention, recognition, and response to food-related allergic reactions. It incorporates food allergy safety into the training provided to personnel involved in school meal services.

== Legislative history ==
=== Introduction and congressional consideration ===
Senator Roger Marshall of Kansas introduced the Whole Milk for Healthy Kids Act of 2025 in the Senate on January 23, 2025, as S. 222. The bill was referred to the United States Senate Committee on Agriculture, Nutrition, and Forestry.

A companion bill, H.R. 649, was introduced in the House of Representatives by Representative Glenn Thompson of Pennsylvania and referred to the United States House Committee on Education and Workforce. On June 5, 2025, the committee reported the measure alongside a report containing majority and minority views.

The Senate Committee on Agriculture, Nutrition, and Forestry reported S. 222 with an amendment on July 10, 2025. The Senate subsequently passed the bill by unanimous consent on November 20, 2025.

The House passed the Senate legislation by voice vote on December 15, 2025. It was presented to President Donald Trump on January 6, 2026, and signed on January 14, becoming Public Law 119-69.

== Implementation ==
=== USDA guidance ===
On January 14, 2026, the United States Department of Agriculture (USDA) Food and Nutrition Service issued implementation guidance to state agencies and school nutrition administrators. The memorandum, designated SP 01-2026, outlined the revised requirements for milk served through the National School Lunch Program.

The guidance addressed the availability of whole and reduced-fat milk, qualifying nondairy beverages, and the treatment of saturated fat in school meal calculations. Other applicable federal meal pattern and nutritional requirements remained in effect.

=== Expansion to other child nutrition programs ===
On May 8, 2026, the USDA published a final rule titled Expanding Fluid Milk Options in Child Nutrition Programs in the Federal Register. The rule extended the availability of whole and reduced-fat milk to several other federally funded child nutrition programs, including the School Breakfast Program, Child and Adult Care Food Program, and Special Milk Program.

The rule established milk requirements according to age. Children aged one are to receive unflavored whole milk, while children aged two through five may receive unflavored whole, reduced-fat, low-fat, or fat-free milk. For children aged six and older and adult participants, both flavored and unflavored varieties are permitted.

It also extended the exclusion of saturated fat from fluid milk in calculations for the School Breakfast Program. Other changes addressed preschool meal patterns, afterschool snack services, and competitive foods regulated under the Smart Snacks in School standards.

The final rule took effect on June 8, 2026. Program operators retained discretion over which permitted milk varieties to offer.

== Public campaign ==
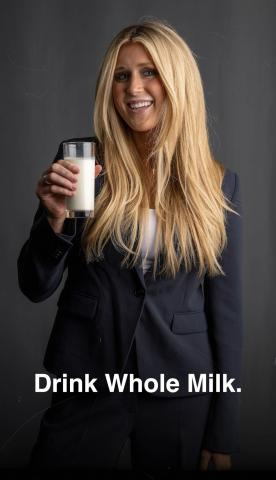
Riley Gaines promoting whole milk for the USDA.

Following the legislation's passage, the United States Department of Agriculture and the United States Department of Health and Human Services published milk-related posts on their social media accounts.

The posts included an edited image of President Donald Trump with a milk mustache, an AI-generated video showing Robert F. Kennedy Jr. drinking milk before being transported to a nightclub, and a video featuring activist and former collegiate swimmer Riley Gaines. In the latter, Gaines stated, "The milk mustache is back."
