= State Administrative Expenses =

Program authorized under Section 7 of the Child Nutrition Act

The State Administrative Expenses (SAE), a program authorized under Section 7 of the Child Nutrition Act (P.L. 89–642, as amended), provides funding to help states meet the administrative costs of operating school lunch, breakfast, and child care food programs and related commodity donation programs authorized under the Child Nutrition Act and the National School Lunch Act (P.L. 79–396).
