= Reduced-price meal =

US federal hunger alleviation programme

Reduced-price meal is a term used in the United States to describe a federally reimbursable meal, or snack, served to a qualified child when the family of the child's income is between 130 and 185 percent of the US federal poverty threshold. Schools may not charge more than US$0.40 for reduced-price lunches, nor more than US$0.30 for reduced-price breakfasts.

== See also ==
- School meal programs in the United States
- National School Lunch Act
