= School nutrition programs in California =

California has various School Nutrition programs that help students receive a nutritional lunch. School nutrition is a way to prevent students from hunger and maintain them healthy in order to participate well in school. It’s normal that a student will receive their school meal at noon or a little after noon. In some cases, students have a reduced lunch price but there are others who qualify to receive free lunch. Those who qualify for free lunch need to show that the household income does not overpass the limit the parents need to earn annually. Not only this but it also depends how many dependents are in the house.

The National School Lunch Program is considered as a federally funded program that helps schools give reduce lunch prices to students as well as free lunch for those who qualify. The National School Lunch Program is a national program but in California, the CDE also known as the California Department of Education is the one in charge of the lunch programs existing in schools. Not only does this program help schools with healthy meals but it also helps child care programs and any community program that will help provide snacks and meals to children (Nutrition). In California there are different programs that help students with their nutrition meal which are; school nutrition, Child and Adult Care Food Program (CACFP), after school, Food and Fitness Fun Education Program (FFFEP) and summer for service.
