= Summer Food Service Program =

Federal program reimbursing organizations for children's meals

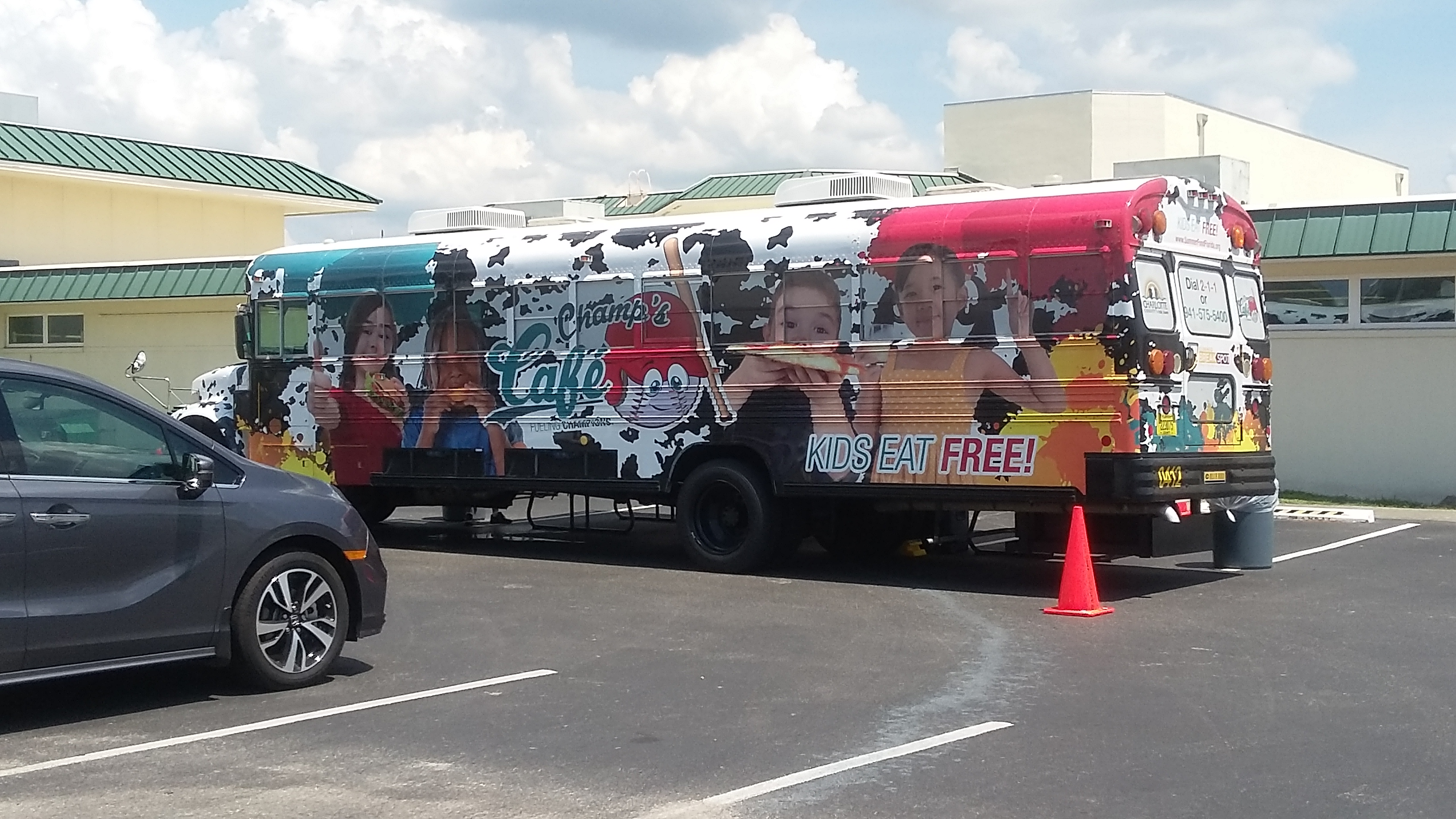
A mobile cafeteria used as part of Charlotte County Public Schools' summer feeding program

The Summer Food Service Program (SFSP) began in 1968. It was an amendment to the National School Lunch Act. Today, the SFSP is the largest federal resource available for local sponsors who want to combine a child nutrition program with a summer activity program. Sponsors can be public or private groups, such as non-profit organizations, government entities, churches, universities, and camps. The government reimburses sponsors for the food at a set rate. There are still communities that have not created a Summer Food Service Program in their community. For those individuals that want to help ensure children have meals during the summer, they can get more information from the USDA or their state government agencies.

During the school year a large number of children in the United States receive free and reduced-lunches through their school lunch programs. However, when the school year ends food insecurity becomes prevalent amongst school-aged children. The Summer Food Service Program helps alleviate the nutritional gap and makes meals accessible to all children less than 18 years of age.

== Legislative history ==
The history of school lunch policies and politics took many years to come to fruition. Like any other policy created, this is a complex web of details pieced together by individuals with a plethora of different interests. "One set of major players includes nutrition reformers – education, health, and key welfare professionals, mainly women – who struggled mightily to translate nutrition science into public policy. Another set of player includes farm-bloc legislators and Department of Agriculture officials who created the institutional infrastructure for a national school lunch program. These groups, together with political leaders responding to the demands and interests of their constituents as well as to the popular appeal of children’s health, shaped national food and nutrition policies."

At the forefront of the National School Lunch Act is its namesake – Richard Russell, Jr. At the time Russell was a senator from Georgia who was concerned with the small town farmer and had a sincere passion for agriculture. Additionally, Russell was deeply committed to matters of national defense, as he served as chair of the Armed Services Committee for sixteen years. In order to insure a powerful national defense, Russell understood it would begin with strong, healthy children. Russell seized the opportunity to improve national defense and support agriculture by authoring the nation's most popular social welfare program.

School lunch politics were not created solely to ensure that America's children receive healthy and nutritious meals. School lunch policies also have to do with agriculture and farmers. "School lunch is, surely, rooted in the science of nutrition and ideas about healthy diets, but those ideas have never been sufficient on their own to shape public policy. School lunch, like other aspects of public policy, has been shaped by the larger forces of politics and power in American history."

The relationship between hungry children and struggling farmers began during the Great Depression. Farmers were producing abundant crops, but no one could afford to buy them. Men and women could not come up with the money to feed their families. Some items are brought to the policy agenda by events that simply demand immediate attention. Faced with struggling farmers and hungry children, the federal government began providing funding in 1935 to purchase farm products to provide school lunches.

The National School Lunch Program did exactly resemble what many had hoped it would. In the late eighteenth century and early nineteenth century the science of nutrition was struggling to find its place in American culture. The general public did not broadly accept the importance of healthy eating and living. However, the economic depression and the New Deal became an opportunity for nutrition reformers to shape food and nutrition policy. "In fact, the National School Lunch Program created in 1946 bore only slight resemblance to the goals of nutrition scientists and home economists. The program was, in its goals, structure and administration, more a subsidy for agriculture than a nutrition program for children. Indeed, the political will to forge a national school lunch program came not from the New Deal social welfare coalition but rather from the Department of Agriculture and a group of southern Democratic legislators who generally opposed federal social programs."

In 1942 Congress was creating their budget, but because of World War II federal money for welfare programs were threatened. It was then that Senator Russell and individuals, such as, George R. Chatfield (chairman of the Coordinating Committee on School Lunches) started rallying their troops and “launched an effort to save the school lunch program”.

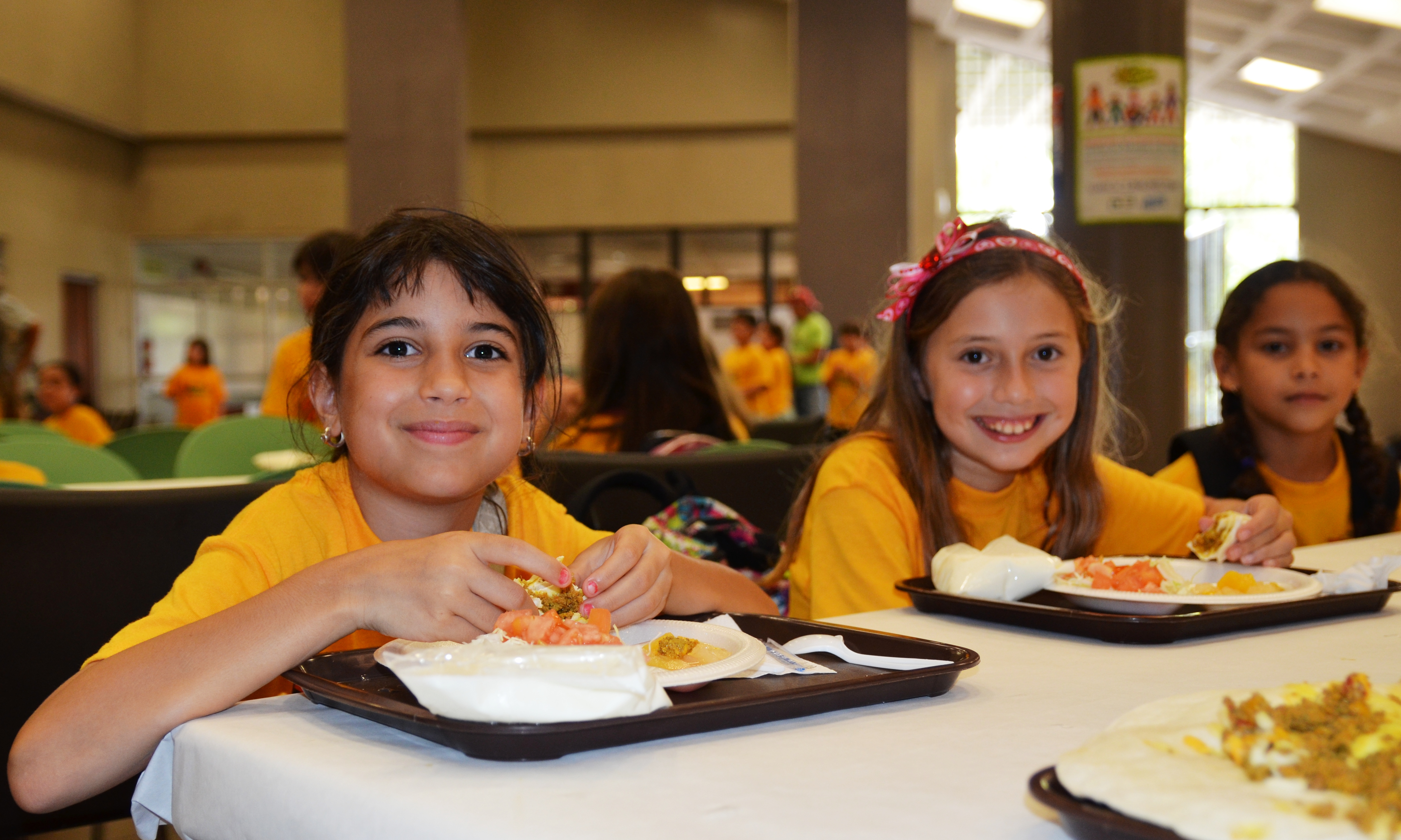

The school lunch coalition proved remarkably effective. Unwilling to appear unsympathetic to children's health, particularly as the nation was mobilizing for war, congress quickly voted to continue appropriations for school lunches. Indeed, by an overwhelming margin, Congress actually increased the appropriation.

== Program history ==
In 1946, President Harry S. Truman signed the National School Lunch Act (NSLA), Public Law 396. According to the School Nutrition Association: The legislation came in response to claims that many American men had been rejected from World War II military service because of diet-related health problems. The federally assisted meal program was established as a measure of national security, to safeguard the health and well-being of the Nation's children and encourage domestic consumption of nutritious agricultural commodities.

President Truman explained in his statement upon signing the NSLA, that “in the long view, no nation is any healthier than its children or more prosperous than its farmers; and in the National School Lunch Act, the Congress has contributed immeasurably both to the welfare of our farmers and the health of our children.”

The Special Food Service Program for Children was created as an amendment to the NSLA in 1968. According to the USDA, “the 3 year pilot provided grants to States to help provide meals for children when school was not in session.” Under the umbrella of the Special Food Service Program were two categories: Summer and Child Care. In 1975, the original National School Lunch Act was further amended to establish the two categories as their own separate programs.

The original requirements of the SFSP included residential summer camps and sites serving areas of poor economic conditions, where at least one-third of the children who qualify for free and reduced price meals, were eligible to participate. All meals were reimbursed at a single rate, and start up and advance payments were made to help sponsors defray the costs of planning and organizing. The Summer Food Service Program has undergone numerous amendments of its own since its conception in 1975. In 1981, “poor economic conditions” was expanded to fifty-percent of the children who qualify for free and reduced price meals, were eligible to participate. In 1994, under the Healthy Meals for Healthy Americans Act, it allowed SFSP to function at non-school locations when there were emergency school closures. In 2004, childhood obesity was an emerging issue. As a result, under the Child Nutrition and WIC re-authorization Act of 2004, the USDA and Congress ramped up their efforts to increase participation in the SFSP. The simplified the application process for families and schools and also included transportation grants to help sponsors access children in rural areas.

The SFSP is the largest Federal resource available for local sponsors who want to combine a child nutrition program with a summer activity program. Groups allowed to participate in SFSP include public and private non-profit groups, government entities, private non-profit organizations, public and private non-profit camps and public and private non-profit universities and colleges.

== Program operation ==
The Food and Nutrition Service, an agency of the U.S. Department of Agriculture, administers SFSP at the Federal level. State education agencies administer the program in most States. In some areas, the State health or social service department or an FNS regional office may be designated. Locally, SFSP is run by approved sponsors, including school districts, local government agencies, camps, or private nonprofit organizations. Sponsors provide free meals to a group of children at a central site, such as a school or a community center. They receive payments from USDA, through their State agencies, for the meals they serve.

States approve SFSP meal sites as open, enrolled, or camp sites. Open sites operate in low-income areas where at least half of the children come from families with incomes at or below 185 percent of the Federal poverty level, making them eligible for free and reduced-price school meals. Meals are served free to any child at the open site. Enrolled sites provide free meals to children enrolled in an activity program at the site where at least half of them are eligible for free and reduced-price meals. Camps may also participate in SFSP. They receive payments only for the meals served to children who are eligible for free and reduced-price meals.

Units of local government, camps, schools, and private nonprofit organizations can sponsor the SFSP.

== Eligibility ==
Children 18 and younger may receive free meals and snacks through SFSP. Meals and snacks are also available to persons with disabilities, over age 18, who participate in school programs for people who are mentally or physically disabled. At most sites, children receive either one or two reimbursable meals each day. Camps and sites that primarily serve migrant children may be approved to serve up to three meals to each child, each day.

Congress appropriated $398 million for SFSP in FY 2012. By comparison, the program cost $110.1 million in 1980; $163.3 million in 1990; $267.2 million in 2000; and $327.4 million in 2008. More than 2.28 million children participated at almost 39,000 sites in the summer of 2012.
