= Child Nutrition Act =

U.S. Great Society legislation of Lyndon B. Johnson

The Child Nutrition Act of 1966 (CNA) is a United States federal law (act) signed on October 11, 1966 by President Lyndon B. Johnson. The Act was created as a result of the "years of cumulative successful experience under the National School Lunch Program (NSLP) to help meet the nutritional needs of children." The National School Lunch Program feeds 30.5 million children per day (as of 2007). NSLP was operated in over 101,000 public and nonprofit private schools in 2007. The Special Milk Program, functioning since 1954, was extended to June 30, 1970 and incorporated into the act. The act also provided Federal funding assistance towards non-food purchases for school equipment.

The act launched the first pilot of the School Breakfast Program, a federally assisted meal program that provides low-cost or free breakfasts to children in public and non-profit schools as well as child care institutions. The program was made permanent in 1975.

== Importance ==
It is important for food programs such as these in schools because some students may receive all their meals from school. According to the CDC, a poor diet can lead to energy imbalance (e.g., eating more calories than one expends through physical activity) and can increase one’s risk for overweight and obesity. Without a well balanced diet it could cause a child's brain to not develop normally (Berger, 172). Children may be malnourished and could possibly suffer from Protein-calorie malnutrition (Berger 172). In the long run if children do suffer from lack of nutrients it will not only impede brain growth but affect their ability to learn as well (Berger, 172). Some students have recognized the importance of a well balanced diet and started programs on a local level. Programs like the School Food Plus Initiative & E.A.T.W.I.S.E (Cooper, 54). Parents are also getting in on the action and have formed school district wellness committees around the country. They are looking forward to developing wellness policies that will charge local school districts with setting targets for nutrition education (Cooper, 84).

== Nutrition standards ==
The National School Breakfast Program feeds 10 million children each day, and the National School Lunch Program feeds more than 30 million students. However, the national standards and meal requirements for these meals were created more than a decade ago. The planning model used to develop current nutritional standards and related meal requirements is based on legislation (USDA, 1995) that provided specifications for use of 1995 Dietary Guidelines for American and the 1989 Recommended Dietary Allowances (Stallings, 89). This model considers needs of the entire population of school children rather than specific individuals (Stallings, 91).

The William F. Goodling Child Nutrition Reauthorization Act of 1998 (Pub. L. 105–336 (text) (PDF)) extended expiring authorizations for child nutrition and Commodity Assistance Programs, and the WIC program, through fiscal year 2003. Among other things, this law significantly expanded the availability of federal subsidies (through the school lunch program and the CACFP) for snacks served in after-school programs and authorized demonstration projects providing free breakfasts for elementary school children without regard to family income. Modest revisions were made to child nutrition and WIC program rules.

The Child Nutrition and WIC Reauthorization Act of 2004 (S. 2507, Pub. L. 108–265 (text) (PDF)) required that all school districts with a federally funded school meal program develop wellness policies that address nutrition and physical activity.

The Fresh Fruit and Vegetable Snack Program (Food and Nutrition Service) was also designed to increase fruit and vegetables available to schools. In 2008, a farm bill called for gradual expansion of program to all states by 2012.

In the fall of 2009 the Institute of Medicine recommended updates and revisions to the school lunch and breakfast programs, at the request of U.S. Department of Agriculture (USDA). The committee reviewed the current regulations for the National School Lunch Program and School Breakfast Program Nutrition Standards and Meal Requirements. The planning model used to develop current nutritional standards and related meal requirements is based on legislation (USDA,1995) that provided specifications for use of 1995 Dietary Guidelines for American and the 1989 Recommended Dietary Allowances (NRC, 1989). To meet its task, the IOM committee also reviewed and assessed the food and nutritional needs of school-aged children in the United States using the 2005 Dietary Guidelines for Americans set by the Department of Health and Human Services (HHS) and USDA, as well as the IOM’s Dietary Reference Intakes (DRI). The committee recommends numerous revisions and that emphasis be placed on revised Meal Requirements rather than on nutrients per se. The committee’s recommended new approach clearly focuses on providing meals that are consistent with the Dietary Guidelines for Americans. The final report, School Meals: Building Blocks for Healthy Children was released in November 2009. The committee recommended that the USDA adopt standards for menu planning, including:

- Increasing the amount and variety of fruits, vegetables, and whole grains
- Setting a minimum and maximum level of calories
- Focusing more on reducing saturated fat and sodium

On January 13, 2011, the USDA published new proposed regulations in the Federal Register based on the IOM recommendations, as part of the Healthy, Hunger-Free Kids Act of 2010.

== See also ==
- Child and Adult Care Food Program
- Institute of Child Nutrition
- School Nutrition Association
- Share Our Strength
- State Administrative Expenses
