= Ezra Edelman =

American documentary producer and director

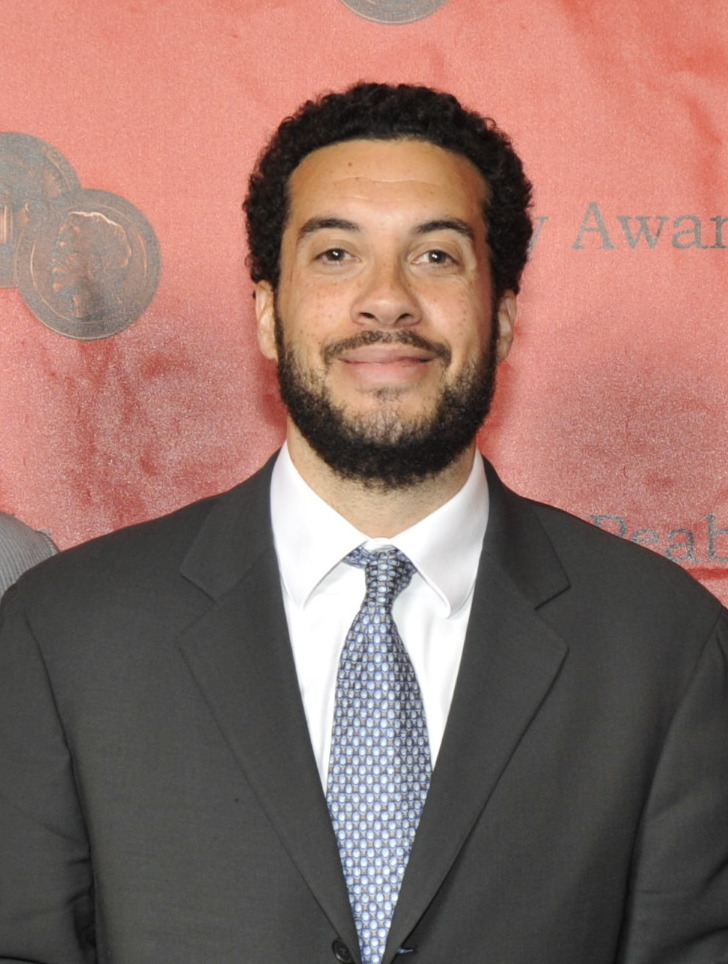
- Edelman at the 70th Annual Peabody Awards, 2011
- Born: Ezra Benjamin Edelman; August 6, 1974 (age 52); Boston, Massachusetts, U.S.
- Education: Yale University (BA)
- Occupations: Television director, television producer
- Parents: Peter Edelman (father); Marian Wright Edelman (mother)
- Relatives: Jonah Edelman (brother)

Ezra Benjamin Edelman (born August 6, 1974) is an American documentary producer and director. He won the Academy Award for Best Documentary Feature and the Primetime Emmy Award for Outstanding Directing for Nonfiction Programming for directing O.J.: Made in America (2016). He has also directed The Book of Prince, a documentary on the musician Prince, that remains unreleased.

== Early life and education ==
Edelman was born in Boston, Massachusetts. He is the son of Marian Wright Edelman, former civil rights leader and aide to Martin Luther King Jr. and founder and president of the Children's Defense Fund, and Peter Edelman, former aide to Senator Robert F. Kennedy, former Assistant Secretary of Health and Human Services for Planning and Evaluation, and professor at Georgetown University Law Center. His father is Jewish. He has two brothers, Joshua, an educational administrator, and Jonah, co-founder and CEO of Stand for Children. His parents were the third interracial marriage in Virginia after the U.S. Supreme Court overturned the state's anti-miscegenation law in Loving v. Virginia. His paternal great-grandfather was a Polish rabbi who was killed during the Holocaust and his maternal grandfather was a Baptist minister; he was raised in both faiths.

Edelman graduated from Sidwell Friends School in Washington D.C. in July 1992, before going on to earn his bachelor's degree from Yale University.

== Career ==
=== Documentary projects ===
Edelman is best known for producing and directing the Academy Award-winning 2016 documentary film O.J.: Made in America for ESPN's 30 for 30. In his Oscar acceptance speech, Edelman dedicated the award to Nicole Brown Simpson and Ron Goldman, whom O. J. Simpson had been tried and acquitted of murdering in 1995. Previously he directed three HBO Sports documentaries: Magic & Bird: A Courtship of Rivals, The Curious Case of Curt Flood (2011) and the Emmy Award-winning Brooklyn Dodgers: Ghosts of Flatbush. He also wrote and directed a special on the former Big East Conference called Requiem for the Big East, also a part of the 30 for 30 series. Edelman produced Wyatt Cenac's Problem Areas, an HBO documentary series that ran for two seasons.

In 2024, Edelman produced Stax: Soulsville U.S.A. for HBO, revolving around Stax Records. and Vow of Silence: The Assassination of Annie Mae for Onyx Collective and Hulu, revolving around Indigenous activist Anna Mae Aquash.

In 2018, it was reported that Edelman would be developing a biopic with writer Rowan Ricardo Phillips for Legendary Entertainment, based on the life of baseball player Roberto Clemente.

==== The Book of Prince ====
Over five years Edelman developed The Book of Prince a nine-hour, six-part documentary about the musician Prince. He was recruited to the project for Netflix in 2019 by Lisa Nishimura, then vice president of independent film and documentary features, with the promise of access to "the vault," Prince's archive of unreleased material. This was negotiated by the bank administering Prince's estate; Netflix reportedly paid tens of millions of dollars for the access in a deal that gave Edelman and Netflix editorial control of the resulting film. However, while the project was underway, Nishimura was laid off, and the estate changed hands, with former Prince attorney L. Londell McMillan leading objections to the depiction of Prince in the documentary and seeking to block the film's release.

In September 2024, The New York Times Magazine reported, "As of today, there is no indication that the film will ever come out." In February 2025, Prince's estate officially announced that the documentary would never be released and, instead, a new documentary would be produced without Edelman. Edelman said in a March 2025 interview that it would never be released because he doesn't "feel like getting sued."

== Personal life ==
Edelman lives in Brooklyn, New York City.
