= Jonah Edelman =

American advocate for public education

- Born: Jonah Martin Edelman; October 9, 1970 (age 55); Washington, D.C., U.S.
- Education: Yale University (BA); Balliol College, Oxford (MPhil, DPhil)
- Occupations: Co-founder and CEO of Stand for Children
- Parents: Peter Edelman (father); Marian Wright Edelman (mother)

Jonah Martin Edelman (born October 9, 1970) is an American advocate for public education. He is the co-founder and chief executive officer of Stand for Children, a national American education advocacy organization based in Portland, Oregon, with affiliates in nine states.

== Early life and education ==
Jonah Edelman is the second son of Marian Wright Edelman, former civil rights leader and aide to Martin Luther King Jr. and founder and president of the Children’s Defense Fund, and Peter Edelman, former aide to Senator Robert F. Kennedy, former assistant secretary of the Department of Health and Human Services, and professor at Georgetown University Law Center. His brother Ezra produced and directed the documentary O.J.: Made in America.

Edelman was born and raised in Washington, D.C., and received his B.A. in history with a concentration on African-American studies from Yale University in 1992, where he was awarded the Alpheus Henry Snow Prize. Edelman attended Balliol College, Oxford, on a Rhodes Scholarship, earning his Master of Philosophy in 1994 and Doctor of Philosophy in 1995, both in politics. His dissertation was titled, "The passage of the Family Support Act of 1988 and the politics of welfare reform in the United States".

Edelman cites tutoring a six-year-old bilingual child named Daniel Zayas in reading while volunteering at Dwight Elementary School during his first year at Yale as a turning point. While still an undergraduate, he ran a teen pregnancy prevention speakers' bureau, co-founded a mentorship program for African American middle school students, and served as an administrator of an enrichment program for children living in public housing—Leadership Education and Athletics in Partnership (LEAP). Jonah Edelman has twin college-age sons and lives in Portland, Oregon.

== Stand for Children ==
Edelman was a key organizer of Stand for Children Day, a June 1, 1996 rally at the Lincoln Memorial in Washington, D.C., attended by 300,000 people. Among the speakers at this rally, the largest for children in U.S. history, were Geoffrey Canada, who later became Stand for Children’s first board of directors chair, the editor of Parade Magazine, Walter Anderson, who came up with the name "Stand for Children Day," and Marian Wright Edelman.

On June 2, 1996, Edelman and Eliza Leighton founded Stand for Children as an ongoing advocacy organization to support rally participants when they returned home. Hundreds of follow up Stand for Children events and rallies took place across the country on June 1, 1997, and then June 1, 1998.

Stand for Children's mission is to ensure all students receive a high quality, relevant education, especially those whose boundless potential is overlooked or under-tapped because of their skin color, zip code, first language, or disability. Stand's top priority areas concern increasing high school graduation rates, college and career preparation, literacy proficiency levels of economically disadvantaged students, and achieving equitable and adequate funding.

Since its founding in 1996, Stand has achieved numerous legislative victories for students and created programs aimed at boosting academic success. Stand helped secure the passage and full funding of Measure 98 in Oregon, which provides $303 million to enable the state's school districts to expand evidence-based dropout prevention strategies, career technical education pathways, college credit courses, and post-secondary counseling. In Washington, Stand helped pass the nation's first-ever statewide Advanced Placement course enrollment equity requirement. Stand also played a pivotal role in advocating for the passage of funding for full-day kindergarten in Colorado in 2019.

In 2017, Stand developed the Center for High School Success, which partners with high schools and districts across the country to significantly increase 9th Grade On-Track Rates, reduce chronic absenteeism, improve attendance, and strengthen Career Technical Education and Dual Credit pathways.

In 2022, early literacy expert Dr. Nell Duke joined Stand for Children to create the Center for Early Literacy and Learning Success. In 2024, after eight years of development and piloting, Dr. Duke and a team of researchers finished the Great First Eight curriculum, the first-ever comprehensive curriculum for children from age 0-8.

During the COVID-19 pandemic, Edelman leadership catalyzed Project 100, a groundbreaking initiative with Propel and GiveDirectly that raised and efficiently distributed $195 million to nearly 200,000 families in need.

== Past controversy ==
At the Aspen Ideas Festival on June 28, 2011, Edelman was the center of a controversy due to remarks he made regarding recent concessions by teachers' unions leading to landmark education reform legislation in Illinois. While unions and legislators say they engaged in a collaborative effort in which all sides gave a little in an effort to improve Illinois’ schools, Edelman told attendees at the Festival, that, actually, he led a well-funded campaign that used lobbyists and shrewd political gamesmanship to pressure union leaders to give up their rights.

Subsequent to this speech, a video of Edelman’s lecture went viral. Afterwards, he apologized for his "arrogance" in claiming his political manipulations alone passed the bill to the exclusion of unions’ contributions.

== Honors ==
- 1992: Rhodes Scholarship
- 1992: Alpheus Henry Snow Prize, Yale University
- 2005: Hunt Alternatives Fund Prime Mover
- 2007: Ashoka Fellow
