= Peter Edelman =

American lawyer (born 1938)

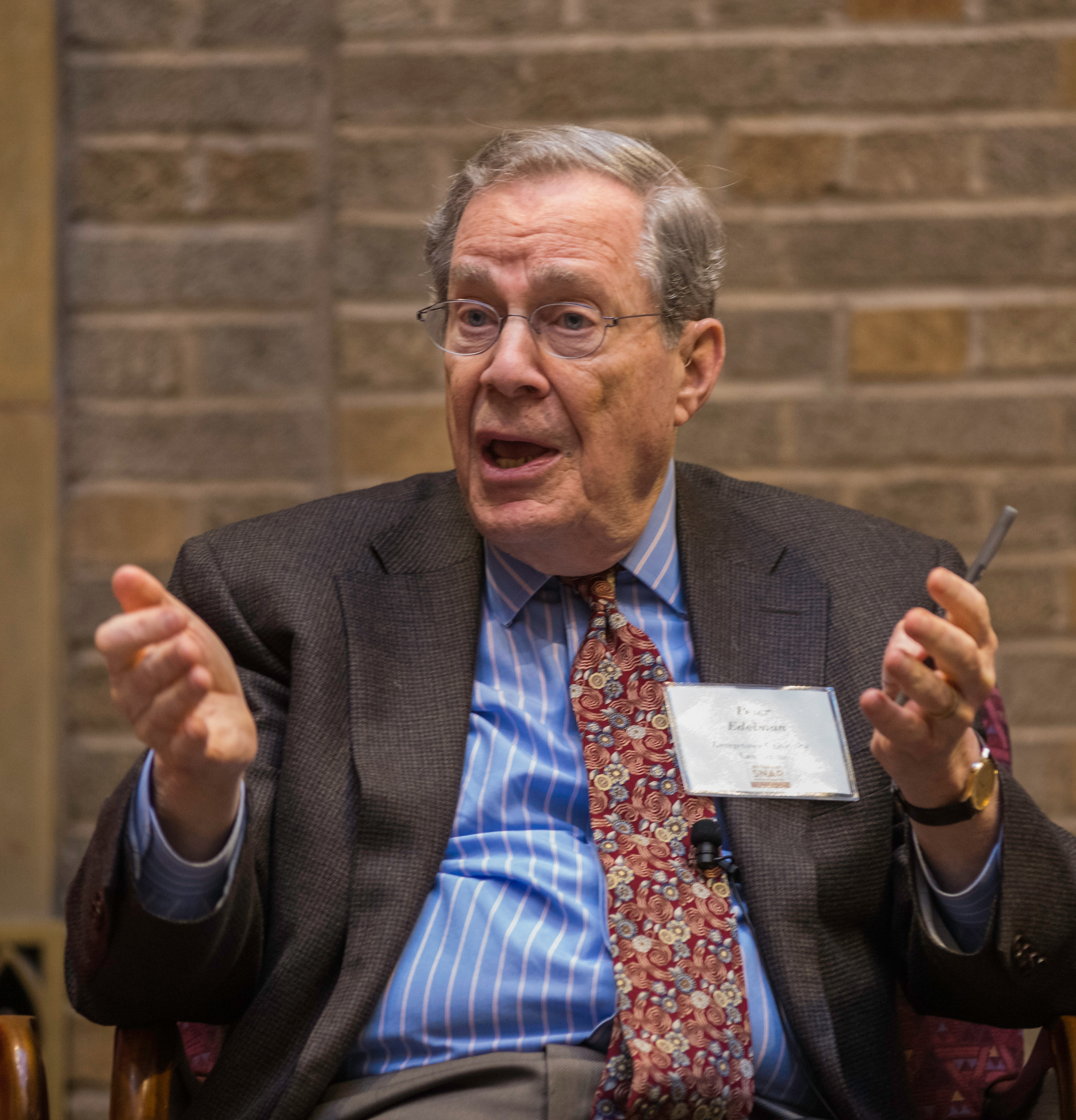
- Edelman in 2014

Assistant Secretary of Health and Human Services for Planning and Evaluation
- In office 1994 – September 1996
- President: Bill Clinton
- Preceded by: David T. Ellwood
- Succeeded by: Margaret Hamburg

Personal details
- Born: Peter Benjamin Edelman; January 9, 1938 (age 88) Minneapolis, Minnesota, U.S.
- Spouse: Marian Wright (m. 1968)
- Children: 3, including Jonah and Ezra
- Education: Harvard University (AB, LLB)

Peter Benjamin Edelman (born January 9, 1938) is an American legal scholar. He is a professor at the Georgetown University Law Center, specializing in the fields of poverty, welfare, juvenile justice, and constitutional law. He worked as an aide for Senator Robert F. Kennedy and in the Clinton Administration, where he resigned to protest Bill Clinton's signing the welfare reform legislation. Edelman was one of the founders and president of the board of the New Israel Fund.

== Early life and education ==
Edelman grew up in a Jewish family in Minneapolis, Minnesota, the son of Hyman and Miriam Edelman. His father worked as a lawyer and his mother worked as a homemaker. His grandfather Eliezer Edelman was a rabbi in Poland; Eliezer and his wife were shot and killed by the Nazis during World War II.

Edelman received his A.B. in 1958 from Harvard College and LL.B. degree from Harvard Law School. He served as a law clerk to Judge Henry Friendly of the U.S. Court of Appeals for the Second Circuit and then for U.S. Supreme Court Justice Arthur Goldberg.

== Career ==
Edelman worked in the United States Department of Justice as special assistant to assistant attorney general John W. Douglas. Edelman worked as a legislative assistant to Senator Robert F. Kennedy, from 1964 to 1968, accompanying Kennedy to his meeting with labor leader Cesar Chavez. Edelman also met his wife while touring impoverished areas of Mississippi with Kennedy to prepare for reauthorization of the Economic Opportunity Act of 1964. Following Kennedy's assassination, Edelman spent brief periods working as deputy director for Robert F. Kennedy Human Rights, issues director for Arthur Goldberg's New York gubernatorial campaign, and vice president of the University of Massachusetts from 1972 to 1975.

Edelman became director of the New York state Division for Youth, in 1975, joined Foley & Lardner as partner in 1979, and served as issues director for Senator Edward Kennedy's presidential campaign in 1980. In 1981, he helped found Parents United in the District of Columbia to empower parents to advocate for educational quality in DC's public schools. Edelman has taught at Georgetown since 1982.

=== Clinton administration ===
Edelman took a leave of absence during Clinton's first term, to serve as counselor to HHS Secretary Donna Shalala and then as Assistant Secretary of Health and Human Services for Planning and Evaluation.

In late 1994, Clinton considered nominating Edelman to a seat on the United States Court of Appeals for the District of Columbia Circuit that had become vacant with the decision by Abner Mikva to retire from the bench on September 19, 1994, to become White House counsel. However, Clinton feared a difficult confirmation battle, later successfully nominating Merrick Garland to the seat. In 1995, Clinton mulled nominating Edelman to the federal district court in Washington D.C., but in August 1995, abandoned that possibility as well.

In September 1996, Edelman resigned from the Clinton administration in protest of Clinton signing the Personal Responsibility and Work Opportunity Act. According to Edelman, the 1996 welfare reform law destroyed the safety net.

=== Later career ===
Edelman has served as an associate dean of the Georgetown University Law Center, the president of the board of New Israel Fund, from June 2005 to June 2008. Edelman served on the board of the Center for Community Change, the Public Welfare Foundation, Americans for Peace Now, the Center for Law and Social Policy and the American Constitution Society, among others. In 1990, Edelman was elected to the Common Cause National Governing Board. He currently serves as chair of the seventeen-member Access to Justice Commission for the District of Columbia, a panel studying ways to provide access to civil legal representation for those who cannot afford it.

== Personal life ==
Edelman is married to Marian Wright Edelman, founder of the Children's Defense Fund and the first black woman admitted to the bar in Mississippi. They have three sons: Joshua, Jonah and Ezra.

== Honors ==
- Former United States–Japan Leadership Program Fellow
- Former J. Skelly Wright Memorial Fellow at Yale Law School

== Selected bibliography ==
=== Books ===
- Not a Crime to Be Poor: The Criminalization of Poverty in America (The New Press, 2017).
- So Rich, So Poor: Why It's So Hard to End Poverty in America (The New Press, 2012).
- Reconnecting Disadvantaged Young Men. With Harry JHolzer and Paul Offner. (Washington, D.C.: Urban Institute Press, 2006).
- Contributor, Community Programs to Promote Youth Development (Jacqueline Eccles & Jennifer Appleton Gootman eds., Natl Acad. Press 2002).
- The Future of Social Insurance: Incremental Action or Fundamental Reform? (Peter B. Edelman et al. eds., Nat'l Acad. Soc. Ins. 2002).
- Searching for America's Heart: RFK and the Renewal of Hope (Houghton Mifflin Co. 2001, Georgetown University Press 2003).
- Adolescence and Poverty: Challenge for the 1990s (Peter B. Edelman & Joyce Ladner eds., Center for National Policy Press 1991).
- And Beryl A. Radin, Serving Children and Families Effectively: How the Past Can Help the Future (Education and Human Services Consortium 1991).
- A New Social Contract: Rethinking the Nature and Purpose of Public Assistance, Report of the Task Force on Poverty and Welfare, State of New York (Peter B. Edelman contr., State of New York 1986).

=== Book chapters ===
- "American Government and the Politics of Youth," in A Century of Juvenile Justice, (Ed.s Margaret K. Rosenheim, Franklin E. Zimring, David S. Tanenhaus, and Bernardine Dohrn, 310–38. Chicago: University of Chicago Press, 2002).
- And Beryl A. Radin, "Effective Services for Children and Families: Lessons From the Past and Strategies for the Future," in Effective Services for Young Children: Report of a Workshop 48 (Lisbeth B. Schorr et al. eds., National Academy Press 1991).
- Response to Elliot Currie, "Crime and Drugs: Reclaiming a Liberal Issue," in Franklin D. Roosevelt and the Future of Liberalism 89 (John F. Sears ed., Meckler 1991).
- "Urban Poverty: Where Do We Go From Here?" in The Future of National Urban Policy 89 (Marshall Kaplan & Franklin James eds., Duke University Press 1990).
- "Creating Jobs for Americans: From MDTA to Industrial Policy," in The Great Society and Its Legacy: Twenty Years of U.S. Social Policy 91 (Marshall Kaplan & Peggy L. Cuciti eds., Duke University Press 1986).
- And Myrtis H. Powell, "Smoothing the Path From School to Work: A Promising Venture in Structural Change," in The State Role in Promoting Youth Employment 1 (Southern Education Foundation 1986).
- "What Shall We Do About America's Poor Now ?" in 3 Money (Eleanor Goldstein ed., Social Issues Resources Series 1986).
- "Institutionalizing Dispute Resolution Alternatives," in Dispute Resolution 505 (Stephen B. Goldberg et al. eds., Little, Brown & Co. 1985).
- "Re-Visioning Public Responsibility," in Beyond Reagan: Alternatives for the '80s 132 (Alan Gartner et al. eds., Harper & Row 1984).
- "Work and Welfare: An Alternative Perspective on Entitlements," in Budget and Policy Choices 1983: Taxes, Defense, Entitlements 51 (W. Bowman Cutter, III et al. eds, Center for National Policy 1983).

=== Journal articles ===
- "Where Is FDR When We Need Him?", 93 Georgetown Law Journal 1681 (2005).
- "Where Race Meets Class: The 21st Century Civil Rights Agenda", 12 Georgetown Journal on Poverty Law & Policy 1 (2005).
- "Welfare and the Politics of Race: Same Tune, New Lyrics", 11 Georgetown Journal on Poverty Law & Policy 389 (2004).
- "The Welfare Debate: Getting Past the Bumper Stickers", 27 Harvard Journal of Public Policy 93 (2003).
- "Beyond Welfare Reform: Economic Justice in the 21st Century", 24 Berkeley Journal of Employment and Labor Law 475 (2003).
- "Remarks, D.C. Consortium of Legal Service Providers: Legal Services 2000 Symposium", 5 University of the District of Columbia Law Review 257 (2002).
- "Succeeding in Uncertain Times: Challenges for Distressed Communities", Keynote address, Reshaping the Fundamentals: Strengthening Community Economies in Turbulent Times, Michigan State University Community and Economic Development Program, East Lansing, MI (July 22, 2002).
- "Welfare Reform: Where Have We Been, Where Are We Going?" Speech, action/research conference sponsored by the Bryn Mawr College Center for Ethnicities, Communities and Social Policy and the Graduate School of Social Work and Social Research, Bryn Mawr, PA, March 1, 2002.
- "TANF Reauthorization: Is Congress Acting on What We Have Learned?", 1 Seattle J. For Soc. Just. 403 (2002).
- "Forgotten Stories About Forgotten People", 55 Nieman Reports 29 (2001).
- Review of The Gentleman from Georgia: The Biography of Newt Gingrich, by Mel Steely, 20 Journal of Policy Analysis and Management 568 (2001).
- "Poverty and Welfare Policy in the Post Clinton Era", 70 Mississippi Law Journal 877 (2001).
- Et al., "A Conservation on Federalism and the States: The Balancing Act of Devolution", 64 Alb. L. Rev. 1091 (2001).
- "Poverty & Welfare: Does Compassionate Conservatism Have a Heart?", 64 Alb. L. Rev. 1073 (2001).
- "Promoting Family by Promoting Work: the Hole in Martha Fineman's Doughnut", 8 Am. U. J. Gender, Soc. Pol'y, & L. 85 (1999).
- Panel Discussion: "Arthur J. Goldberg's Legacies to American Labor Relations", 32 J. Marshall L. Rev. 667 (1999).
- Et al., "A Family Commitment to Families and Children", 37 Fam. & Conciliation Cts. Rev. 8 (1999).
- "The Impact of Welfare Reform on Children: Can We Get It Right Before the Crunch Comes?", 60 Ohio St. L.J. 1493 (1999).
- "So-Called 'Welfare Reform': Let's Talk About What's Really Needed to Get People Jobs", 17 L. & Inequality 217 (1999).
- "Welfare and the 'Third Way'", Dissent 14 (Winter 1999).
- "Responding to the Wake-Up Call: A New Agenda for Poverty Lawyer", 24 New York University Review of Law & Social Change 547 (1998).
- "Opening Address", Symposium: Lawyering for Poor Communities in the Twenty-First Century, 25 Fordham Urb. L.J. 685 (1998).
- "Introduction", Fiftieth Anniversary Volume: Welfare Reform Symposium, 50 Admin. L. Rev. 579 (1998).
- "The Role of Government in the Prevention of Violence", 35 Hous. L. Rev. 7 (1998).
- "The United Nations Convention on the Rights of the Child: Implications For Welfare Reform in the United States", 5 Geo. J. on Fighting Poverty 285 (1998).
- "The Worst Thing Bill Clinton Has Done", The Atlantic 43 (1997).
- "Toward a Comprehensive Antipoverty Strategy: Getting Beyond the Silver Bullet", 81 Geo. L.J. 1697 (1993).
- "Mandated Minimum Income, Judge Posner, and the Destruction of the Rule", 55 Alb. L. Rev. 633 (1992).
- "Justice Scalia's Jurisprudence and the Good Society: Shades of Felix Frankfurter and the Harvard Hit Parade of the 1950s", 12 Cardozo L. Rev. 1799 (1991).
- "Free Press v. Privacy: Haunted by the Ghost of Justice Black", 68 Tex. L. Rev. 1195 (1990).
- "Japanese Product Standards as Non-Tariff Trade Barriers: When Regulatory Policy Becomes a Trade Issue", 24 Stan. J. Int'l L. 389 (1988).
- "Corporate Criminal Liability for Homicide: The Need to Punish Both the Corporate Entity and Its Officers", 92 Dickinson L. Rev. 193(1987).
- "The Next Century of Our Constitution: Rethinking Our Duty to the Poor", 39 Hastings L.J. 1 (1987).
- "Listen Democrats! Memorandum to the Candidate: How You Can Get Beyond the Old Liberalism Without Becoming a 'Neo'", 2 Tikkun 29 (1986).
- "Institutionalizing Dispute Resolution Alternatives", 9 Just. Sys. J. 134 (1984).

== See also ==
- Bill Clinton judicial appointment controversies
- List of law clerks for the second seat of the Supreme Court of the United States
