= Joseph S. Clark's and Robert F. Kennedy's tour of the Mississippi Delta =

United States Senators' investigative tour of the Mississippi Delta

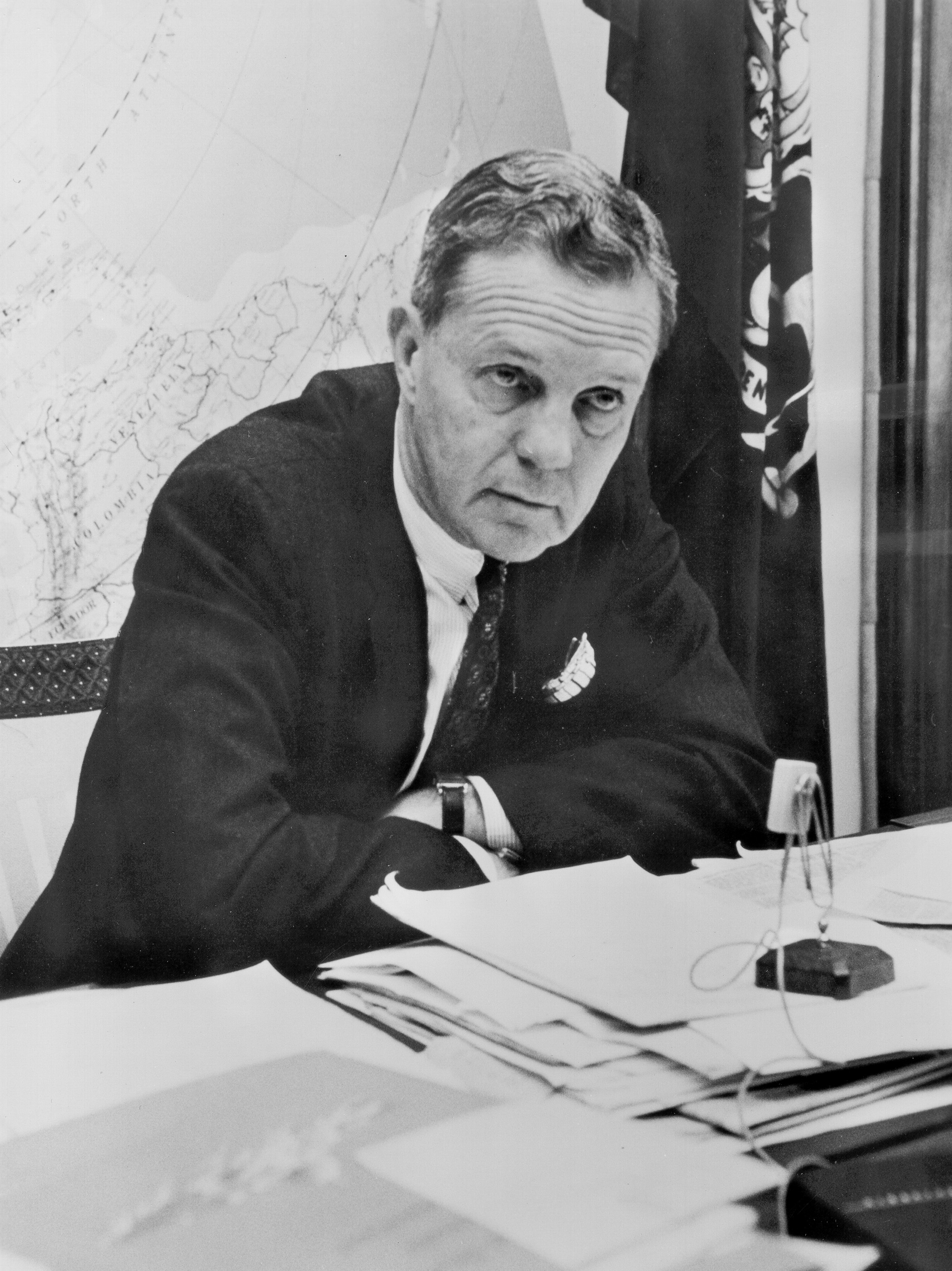
Joseph S. Clark

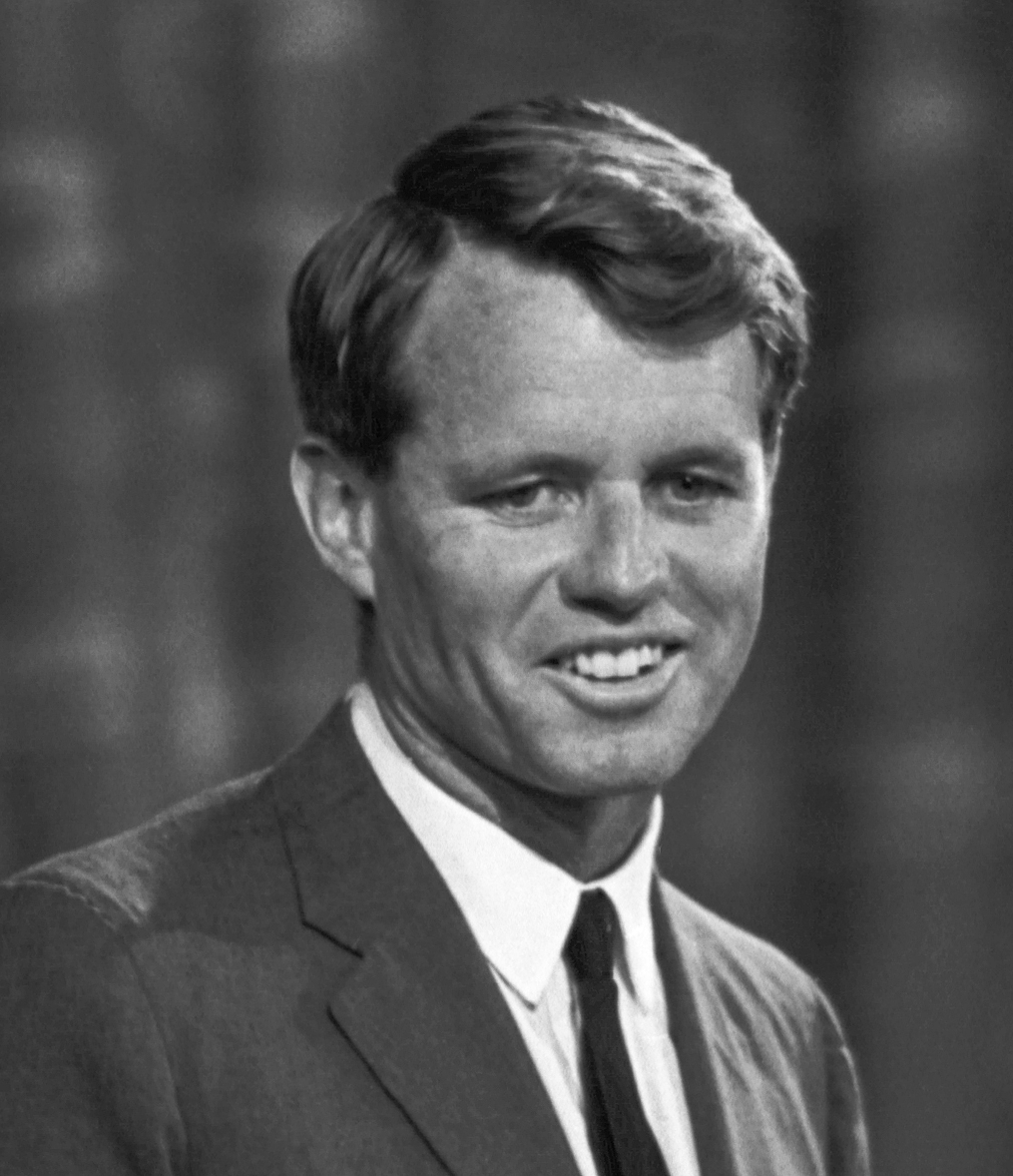
Robert F. Kennedy

On April 10, 1967, United States Senators Joseph S. Clark and Robert F. Kennedy toured the Mississippi Delta at the behest of civil rights lawyer Marian Wright. Clark and Kennedy, together with two other Senators, Jacob Javits and George Murphy, traveled to Mississippi to investigate reports of extreme poverty and starvation. Following a field hearing, they drove from Greenville to Clarksdale, stopping and touring impoverished communities as they went. Deeply disturbed by what they saw, the senators returned to Washington, D.C., and began pushing for a series of reforms to alleviate the situation. Extensive media coverage of the event exposed the American public to real instances of malnutrition and starvation. The country was shocked and hunger became an important topic nationwide as people began looking for solutions. Efforts by the government and political action groups ultimately resulted in the problem being largely reduced by the 1970s.

== Background ==
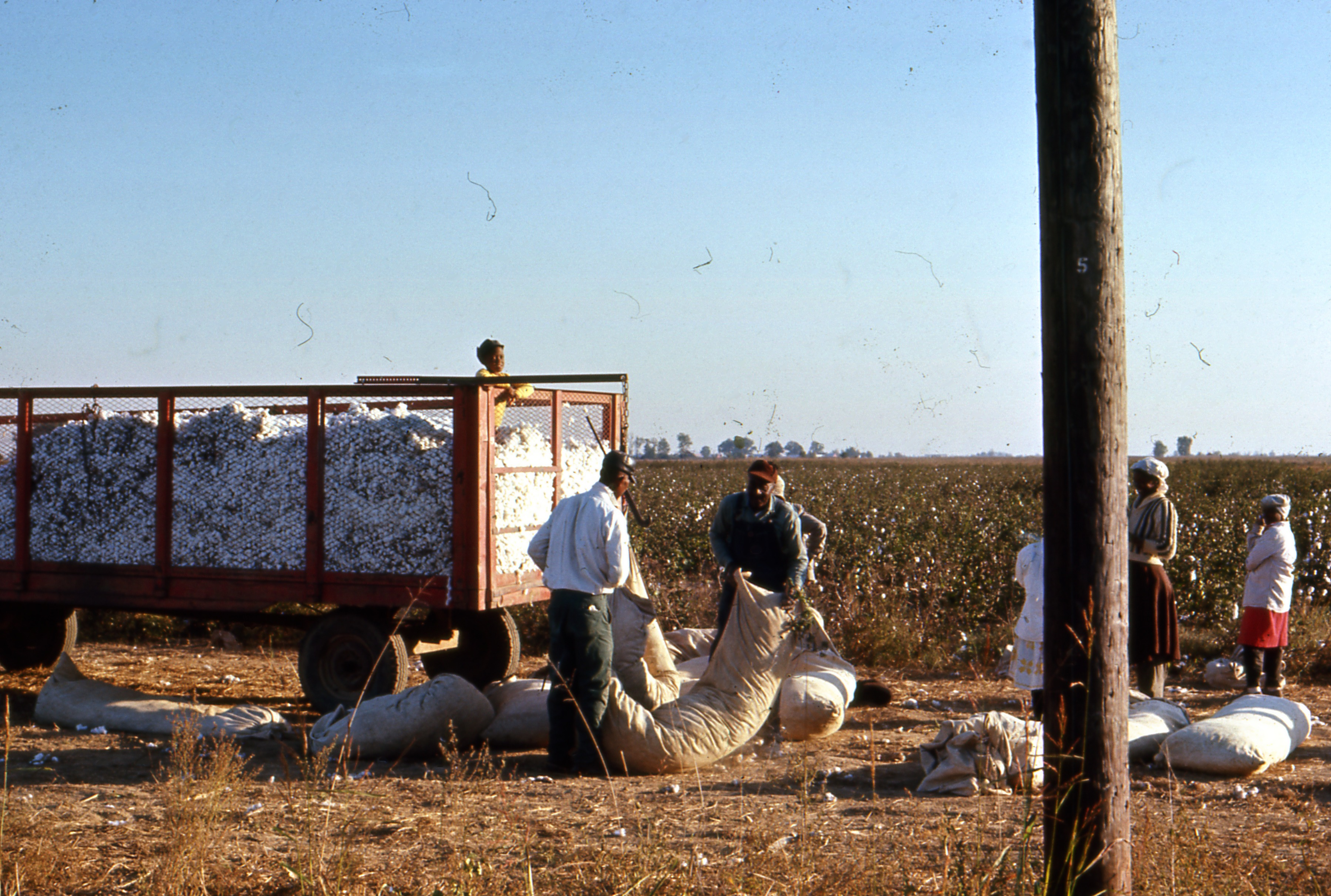
Black cotton pickers in the Mississippi Delta c. 1966

In 1967, the majority of legislative programs supporting the United States government's War on Poverty were due to expire. In an attempt to generate national interest in renewing funding for the effort, the United States Senate Committee on Labor's Subcommittee on Poverty held a series of hearings related to hunger, starting March 15. One of the firsttestifying witnesses was Marian Wright, a 27-year-old Yale Law School graduate working with the NAACP's Legal Defense Fund in Mississippi. She told the subcommittee that increased mechanization and requirements that cotton fields lie fallow under federal subsidy stipulations had put thousands of black sharecroppers out of work in the Mississippi Delta. In addition to this, two-parent families were ineligible for many welfare benefits, and most counties in Mississippi had switched welfare programs from one that distributed surplus food to an alternative that required a monthly purchase of food stamps. With little to no income, most households could not produce the necessary funds. As a result, Wright argued, Mississippians were "starving. They're starving, and those who can get the bus fare to go north are trying to go north... I wish that [the senators] would have a chance to go and just look at the empty cupboards in the Delta and the number of people who are going around and begging just to feed their children."

Chairman Joseph S. Clark suggested that the subcommittee travel to Mississippi to verify Wright's testimony. Of the subcommittee's nine members, Senators Robert F. Kennedy, Jacob Javits, and George Murphy agreed to the idea and accompanied him. Kennedy dispatched his aide, Peter Edelman, to get an advanced view on the situation. Edelman spoke extensively with Wright, whom he would marry 15 months later.

== Trip to the Delta ==
The subcommittee members flew into Jackson on April 9. That evening the senators dined with prominent Mississippians, including Oscar Carr and Charles Evers. Carr later described Kennedy as "a very shy man" who "continuously asked questions." Evers said "We talked and talked and he listened." Local civil rights activist Amzie Moore acted as Kennedy's host.

=== Hearing in Jackson ===
A field hearing was scheduled for April 10. Mississippi Senator John Stennis, a staunch segregationist, was scheduled to be interviewed. He disapproved of the federal efforts to improve the economic situation of black people and sought to discredit them by attacking the Head Start program's parent agency, the Child Development Group of Mississippi (CDGM). The Head Start project provided services to impoverished children and was funded with grants from the federal government, thereby preventing state authorities from interfering with its activities. By potentially improving the socioeconomic status of black Mississippians, Head Start threatened the white political power base that dominated the state. Just days after money for the program had been appropriated, Stennis and state officials began scrutinizing it and requesting financial records. In the days before Stennis' scheduled testimony Jackson's two newspapers, both supportive of segregation, ran several stories about the senator's planned critique. Upon the poverty subcommittee's arrival in the city, Clark announced that he considered questions concerning Head Start and funding irregularities to already be answered and that the hearing would not spend significant time discussing the issue. Stennis responded by leaking his draft testimony to the press.

The subcommittee hearing took place in the Olympic Ballroom of the Heidelberg Hotel in Jackson. It was originally supposed to take place in a room meant to accommodate 300 persons, but the subcommittee relocated after local media attention stirred enough interest to bring the crowd to about 1,000 people. In his opening remarks, Clark stated that the hearing intended to be "neither a witch hunt or a whitewash. We are here to find out the basic facts." Stennis was called as the first witness. He admitted that there was poverty in his state, but posited that federal anti-poverty programs were overrunning expected costs and that he wished to support taxpayers. He then declared that the federal government had bypassed "responsible, honest, capable local leadership" and in favor of northerners and as a result its offices had become "a stake hold of beatniks and immorality". He requested that the governor be empowered to suspend "any project he determines not in the public interest" and finished by highlighting the fact that $500,000–$650,000 of CDGM's funds were proclaimed by a government audit to be unaccounted for.

Clark then allowed members of the subcommittee to question Stennis. Kennedy presented a private report conducted by a New York-based firm at the behest of the college that hosted CDGM. According to the new audit, the amount of wasted funds was deemed to be "relatively minor" and no evidence was found to substantiate the government's allegation. Stennis was flustered and declared that the Senate Committee on Appropriations—of which he was a member—should have been informed of the conflicting calculations. He concluded, "It's another illustration of the mysterious way in which this independent agency operates," thanked the committee for their time, and left the hotel. Testimony was then given about conditions in the Delta from both public officials and local impoverished inhabitants. A black doctor stated that the state suffered from a high infant mortality rate, and that the rate was twice as high for black babies. He added that the mortality rate of black babies from early childhood illnesses was five times greater than that for white infants. Head Start workers testified that older children they had examined displayed symptoms of anemia and other nutritional deficiencies. It was also stated that the decline in demand for agriculture labor increased unemployment, and that many of the adults were unskilled, did not have access to adequate transportation or training programs, or faced racial discrimination in their work. Robert Ezelle, former chairman of the Jackson Chamber of Commerce, asserted that the greatest problem afflicting Mississippi was its dysfunctional education system. He stated that 200,000 adults (out of the total 2 million) had not received schooling beyond the fourth grade and that a further 40,000 had never had any education.

Civil rights activist Unita Blackwell defended the Head Start program, saying it was the only anti-poverty initiative that addressed the locals' problems. When questioned by Kennedy about hunger, she stated that there was a problem with hunger in her county and that the shift from surplus food aid to the stamp program had worsened the situation. Wright spoke once more, asserting, "After two civil rights bills and the third year of the poverty bill, the...Negro in Mississippi is poorer than he was, he has less housing, he is badly educated; he is almost in despair." Kennedy took his greatest interest in the locals' statements. Afterwards, he told Evers, "I want to see it."

=== Kennedy's and Clark's tour ===
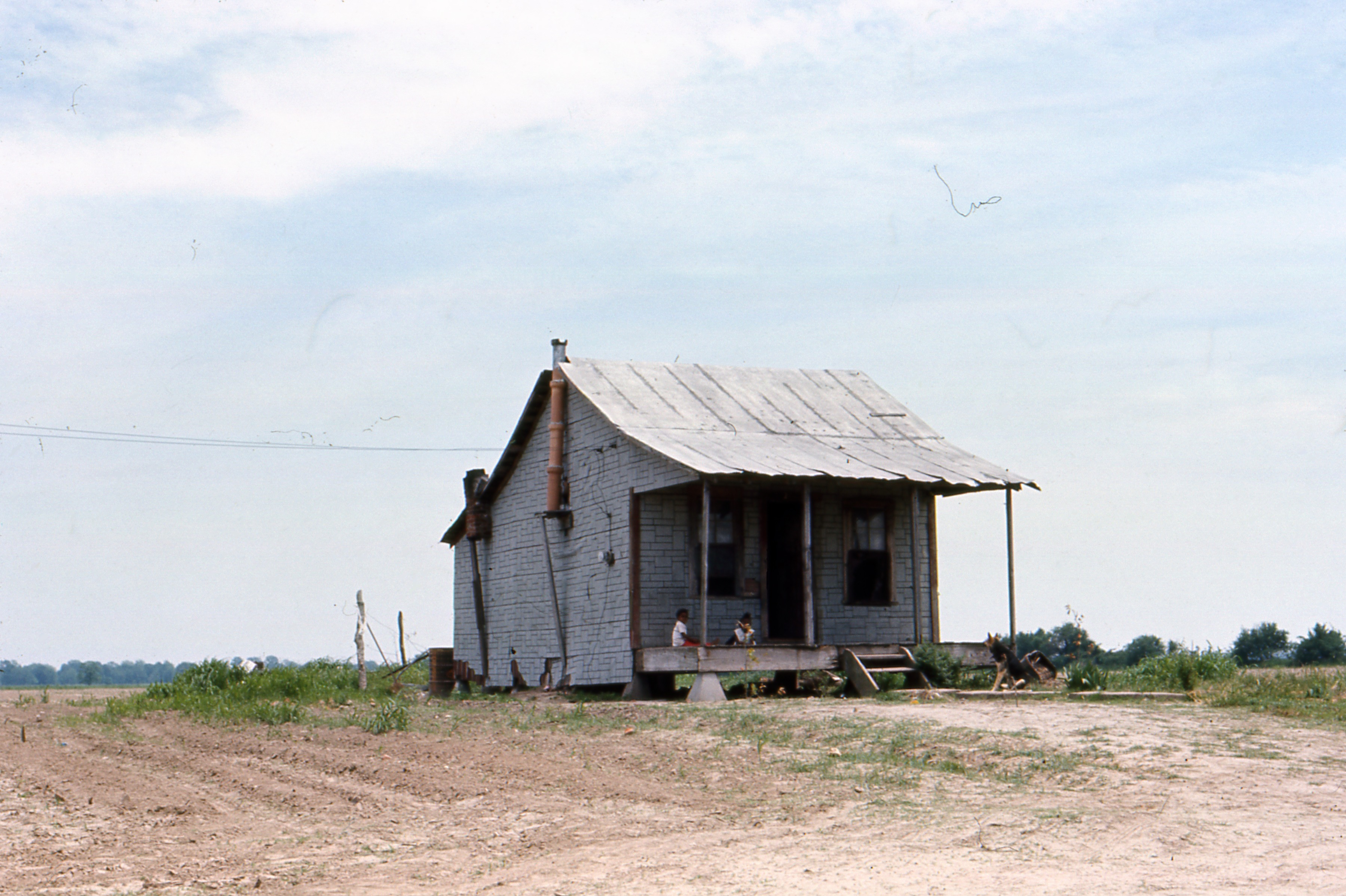
A run-down house in the Mississippi Delta c. 1966

The following day Kennedy and Clark drove into the Delta area, while the other senators flew back to Washington, D.C. They were accompanied by Evers, Wright, Moore, Edelman, Carr, a dozen or so reporters from state and national newspapers and the Big Three television networks, and an assortment of U.S. Marshals, state highway patrolmen, and local police. That morning the senators reviewed anti-poverty programs underway in Greenville and a nearby tent city that had been established by striking farm workers. After lunch, Kennedy's and Clark's motorcade traveled at speeds over 80 mph down U.S. Route 61 to visit locations specifically selected by Wright and Moore.

Their first stop was a dilapidated shotgun house in Cleveland, in which 15 people resided. Holes were present in the flooring and roofing, and the only food in the refrigerator was a jar of peanut butter. One boy told Kennedy that all he had for breakfast and dinner was molasses, and that he didn't eat any lunch. Walking to the next house, Kennedy whispered to Edelman, "I've been to third-world countries and I've never seen anything like this."

The following home belonged to a mother of seven. There were no tables or cutlery in the house, and the toilet operated without plumbing. Roaches and rats ran across the floor. Kennedy's attention was drawn to a 20-month-old boy who was playing with rice grains on the floor. The child was covered in sores and bloated from hunger. Kennedy knelt down and stroked his cheek. He said, "My God, I didn't know this kind of thing existed. How can a country like this allow it? Maybe they just don't know." Clark labeled what lay before them a "national disgrace." Kennedy caressed the child and talked to him, but elicited no response. The senator began to cry. Kennedy stepped outside and quietly remarked, "We spend $75 billion a year on armaments and $3 billion a year on dogs. We have to do more for these children that didn't ask to be born into this." Local newspaper editor Cliff Langford, who strongly disliked Kennedy, shouted back that the two senators were being brainwashed. Clark retorted, "Don't worry. We've been brainwashed from the other side." Langford added, "I don't know of anybody starving down here." Kennedy responded, "Step over here and I'll introduce you to some." Clark reassured the reporters that he and Kennedy were not observing conditions in the Delta to "find fault," but rather "just to see if we can do anything about it."

The senators' motorcade continued on towards Clarksdale, but Kennedy asked that they stop in the small town of Mound Bayou. With no advance notice, Kennedy, his aides, and half a dozen reporters walked into the home of a 39-year-old man named Andrew Jackson, his wife, and their six kids. There was no electricity, running water, or toilet. There were two pictures in the house; one of the Glorybound Singers (a Clarksdale-based Gospel group) and another of John F. Kennedy. Jackson was incredulous that he was meeting the brother of the late president and asked, "Is you really Mr. Bobby Kennedy?" Kennedy smiled and shook his hand, replying, "Yes. And are you really Mr. Andrew Jackson?"

A thousand people—mostly black school children—awaited the senators outside the Clarksdale Neighborhood Center. The two stayed in the city for only 20 minutes; Clark climbed on top of a car to announce that their planned press conference was canceled, as their flight in Memphis was due to take off in two hours for the capital and he was "going to catch that plane." Meanwhile, Kennedy had mounted another vehicle and gave a short speech to the crowd. He said he was glad to have made the trip, and told them, "The problems of poverty are problems of all United States citizens." He was shortly thereafter engulfed by people wanting handshakes and autographs, though police soon cleared the way and the motorcade continued onto the highway.

== Aftermath ==
=== Government response ===
Kennedy returned to Washington, D.C., on the evening of April 10. He walked in on his family having dinner at Hickory Hill, highly agitated and, in the words of his daughter Kathleen, "ashen faced." He announced to his children, "In Mississippi a whole family lives in a shack the size of this room. The children are covered with sores and their tummies stick out because they have no food. Do you know how lucky you are? Do you know how lucky you are? Do something for your country."

The following morning Kennedy and Edelman met with Secretary of Agriculture Orville Freeman, and angrily criticized the food stamp program for charging families that had no income. Though Freeman was keen on avoiding a political dispute with Kennedy, he feared that by concurring with the senator he would anger the Southern bloc in Congress that held great influence over his department's budget. He deflected, "Bob, there isn't anyone in America who has no income." Kennedy replied, "I'll tell you what. I'll send Peter [Edelman] here back down there with some of your people... Will you agree that you'll change the regulations if your people are convinced there really are people in Mississippi who have no income?" Freeman agreed, and was eventually persuaded by incoming evidence to open up access to food stamps. Returning to New York on April 12, Kennedy exclaimed to the wife of one of his aides, "You don't know what I saw! I have done nothing in my life! Everything I have done was a waste! Everything I have done was worthless!" When asked about the Poverty Subcommittee's findings, Clark said that more resources needed to be allocated to the war on poverty. He also said that the United States needed a "reawakening of a conscience." The entire subcommittee sent a letter to President Lyndon B. Johnson about their discoveries and the findings of the Department of Agriculture officials who had been dispatched to the Delta, writing about "conditions of malnutrition and widespread hunger...that can only be described as shocking" and imploring federal government to declare an emergency. Johnson never responded.

Several Johnson administration officials, in addition to Freeman, were skeptical of the reports of starvation in the Delta. Johnson had seen the news coverage of the event and on April 17 he ordered that his top domestic aide, Joseph Califano, give him a "quick report." Califano replied 20 minutes later, writing that Freeman was hesitant to make major changes to the administration's food stamp program until the original system was sanctioned by Congress. When his aides unanimously approved of an extensive relief plan, Johnson, already uneasy about the food stamp program, rejected the proposal. Kennedy made a direct appeal to Johnson involving increased subsidization of food stamps and the supplement of emergency food rations for 40,000–60,000 of the most impoverished Mississippians. Johnson ignored it, a decision an editorial in The Nation claimed was due to the fact that he was "incapable of rising above personal politics." Once news of the situation in the Delta went public, Mississippi Governor Paul B. Johnson Jr. dismissed the report as the product of "Socialist-minded senators." He also told journalist Bill Minor, "all the Negroes I've seen around here are so fat they shine." Following the publication in June of a particularly severe report compiled by the Field Foundation of New York, Governor Johnson quietly commissioned a statewide study about children's nutrition. Its findings concurred with those of the Field Foundation. Mississippi Republican Party chairman Clarke Reed criticized fellow Republican Javits for participating in the subcommittee's investigation, accusing him of joining with "the destructive revolutionary forces in our nation".

On July 11 and July 12, Clark held another set of congressional hearings on hunger in the Delta to pressure Freeman, attracting widespread media coverage. The hearings were tense with Clark, Kennedy, Javits, and testifying medical observers frequently clashing with Mississippi Senators Stennis and James Eastland (also a staunch segregationist), and Mississippi Board of Health officer A. L. Gray. Kennedy called child psychologist Robert Coles to testify on poverty's effect on children in the Mississippi Delta. One North Carolina doctor described "an unwritten policy on the part of those who control the State to eliminate the Negro Mississippian either by driving him out of the State or starving him to death." When Stennis and Eastland accused the doctor of committing libel against the welfare workers of their state, he invited them and other state officials to go see conditions for themselves, to which none accepted. On the second day of proceedings Secretary Freeman and Senator Javits got into a shouting match, with the senator arguing that the secretary should disregard local authorities' opinions, declare an emergency, and immediately supply food to the region. He remarked, "We seem to be able to send airplanes to the Congo in a terrible hurry. We first heard of the desperation point of poor Mississippi Negroes 18 months ago [...] and we are still hearing that there is starvation in Mississippi." Kennedy openly expressed his frustration with Johnson administration officials' perceived inability to understand the extent of the Delta's problems and other bureaucratic complications, saying, "It seems to me we are floundering around a great deal."

In the end, Kennedy managed to amend the renewal of the Economic Opportunity Act of 1964 to include provisions for a national survey on nutrition. Stennis was so embarrassed by the hearings that he proposed a $10 million emergency fund be established for food and medical services. Despite resistance from other Southern legislators and a lack of support from President Johnson, Stennis' bill passed. The Senate also voted unanimously to create a Select Committee on Nutrition and Human Needs. Kennedy subsequently embarked on more "poverty tours" to investigate and publicize impoverished conditions across the United States. He frequently invoked the Delta tour in legislative discussions and during his 1968 presidential campaign.

=== Public reaction ===
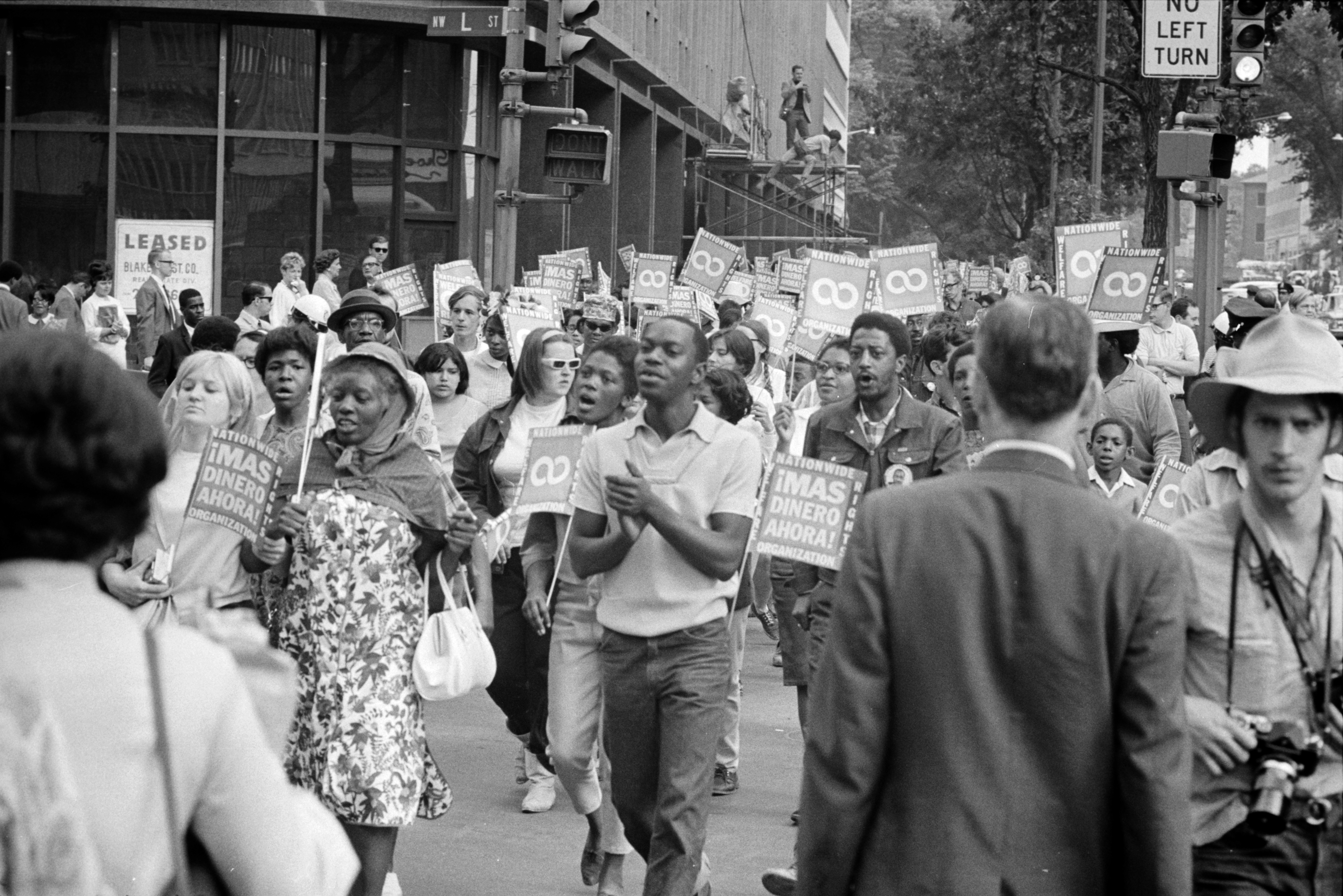
Demonstrators of the Poor People's March on Washington

The media coverage from the event brought national attention to the food insecurity issues in the Delta. Most Americans were shocked by the conditions described in the area. Almost immediately, the Field Foundation of New York dispatched a team of doctors to Mississippi to examine children and verify the senators' findings. They labeled the conditions they observed a "national disaster," documenting cases of Kwashiorkor, Rickets, and other signs of malnutrition and starvation. One doctor likened state of affairs to the worst he had seen in eastern Kenya. This countered initial public reactions of disbelief at the severity of the situation. The Citizens Crusade Against Poverty, an advocacy group already studying the problems in the Delta, quickly created a "Citizens' Board of Inquiry into Hunger and Malnutrition in the United States." In April 1968, the board published a report of its findings, entitled Hunger U.S.A.. This was shortly followed by a critique of the National School Lunch Program by a coalition of women's organizations.

In conversation with Wright and Edelman, Kennedy remarked, "The only way there's going to be change is if it's more uncomfortable for Congress not to act than it is for them to act...You've got to get a whole lot of poor people who just come to Washington and stay here until [...] Congress gets really embarrassed and they have to act." The following week Wright proposed the idea to Martin Luther King Jr., who subsequently organized the Poor People's March on Washington. Around the same time CBS broadcast a major documentary, Hunger in America, which had been made on the suggestion of Kennedy to television executive Don Hewitt.

== Legacy ==
The trip to the Mississippi Delta made hunger a public issue of interest in the United States. Following the revelations of food insecurity, a powerful anti-hunger movement emerged in the country and worked to reform food assistance programs while proposing new ones. Federal expenditures on food assistance grew by 500 percent over the next decade. Marian Wright would later say that the episode "set in motion a chain of events that culminated in years later in the virtual elimination of hunger in America during the Nixon years."

The Mississippi Delta tour was featured in the 1980s American civil rights documentary series, Eyes on the Prize. In May 1997, Democratic Senator Paul Wellstone, inspired by the original trip, visited the Delta to bring attention to "race and gender and poverty and children in America." From July 11 until July 12, 2017, Wright led local activists and politicians on a bus tour of the region to observe the 50th anniversary of the event. It was followed by a panel discussion on poverty, hunger, and healthcare in the Mississippi.

== See also ==
- Great Society
