= Heidelberg Hotel =

Hotel in Jackson, Mississippi, which operated from 1922 to 1974

Coordinates: 32.299855°N 90.187335°W

- Interactive map of the Heidelberg Hotel area

General information
- Location: Jackson, Mississippi, United States
- Opened: May 1, 1922
- Closed: November 14, 1974
- Demolished: January–November 1977
- Owner: Roy L. Heidelberg

Design and construction
- Architect: William A. Brasher
- Main contractor: I.C. Garber

The Heidelberg Hotel was a hotel in Jackson, Mississippi, which operated from 1922 to 1974. The hotel was notable for several firsts: It was the first fireproof building in Mississippi, and the first hotel to break the state's color barrier in 1964 in reversing its policy to allow African-Americans to book hotel rooms. Other local hotels followed shortly thereafter. The hotel also held the premier concert of the newly-formed Jackson Symphony Orchestra in 1944, was the site of John F. Kennedy's first speech in the southern United States in 1957, and then a destination for senators Joseph S. Clark and Robert F. Kennedy in 1967 when on a fact-finding tour of the Mississippi Delta.

== History ==
The hotel opened its doors on May 1, 1922. The Clarion-Ledger, Jackson's newspaper, dedicated two pages of its April 30 Sunday edition to the opening of the five-story hotel, which was described the first fire-proof building in the state of Mississippi. The hotel opened with 124 rooms, all boasting an electric fan.

In 1930, Heidelberg and hotel manager J.L. Latimer acquired A.H. Alvis's interest in the hotel and spent $200,000 on a renovation, which included adding three stories to the original building.

Another $250,000 renovation followed in 1955, which added two banquet rooms on the 13th and 14th stories of the hotel, and modernized the lobby's furnishings.

On October 17, 1957, the hotel was the site of John F. Kennedy's first campaign speech in the southern United States. Kennedy made a statement supporting school integration to a packed room of Mississippi Democrats in the hotel's Victory Room and Foyer.

After Roy Heidelberg's death, the hotel was leased to Alvin Grubbs and Arthur Landstreet in 1959, who continued to renovate the hotel.

In July 1964, two NAACP members, Dr. H. Claude Hudson and Kenneth Guscott, checked into the Heidelberg, ending the city of Jackson's segregationist policies with regards to its downtown hotels.

According to a newspaper columnist who was served the drink, the hotel served the first legal drink in Jackson after Mississippi's prohibition law was repealed in 1966.

The hotel was the headquarters of the 60th NAACP convention in 1969.

The American Hotel Operators Group leased the building starting in September 1973. However, the hotel cancelled the lease in April 1974 after the group's owner was indicted for giving false information to a bank, leaving the hotel $250,000 in debt.

== Closure and Demolition ==
The hotel closed on November 14, 1974. The hotel's downtown location could not compete with newer chain hotels. A $2 million renovation would have been required to bring the hotel up to modern standards, but the money was not available. At the hotel's closing, the manager hoped someone would renovate and reopen the hotel.

In May 1976, the Jackson Redevelopment Authority purchased the building for $550,000 and announced their intention to raze the building in August. The building's liquidation sale occurred in November 1976 with demolition proceeding the following January and occurring through 1977 due to a short-staffed demolition contractor.
