= Starsky Wilson =

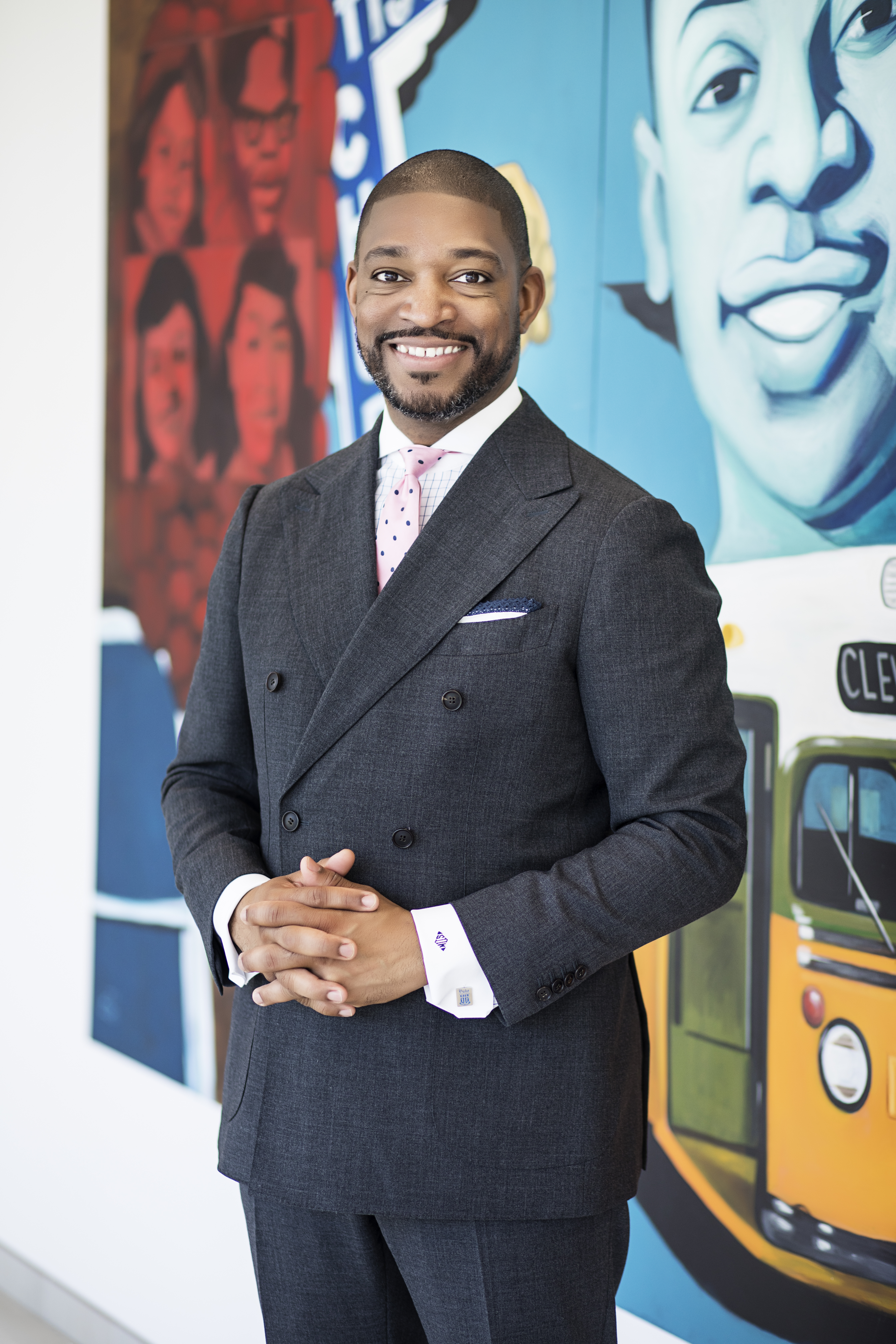
- Born: August 2, 1976 (age 50); Dallas, Texas, U.S.
- Education: Xavier University of Louisiana (BA); Eden Theological Seminary (MDiv); Duke University (DMin)
- Occupations: Pastor, Civil rights activist
- Organization: Children's Defense Fund
- Spouse: LaToya Smith
- Children: 4

Starsky Wilson (born 1976, Dallas, Texas) is an American activist and minister who is the president of the Children's Defense Fund. He is known for advocating for children's rights and racial equity.

== Education ==
Wilson, a native of Dallas, traveled to Xavier University in New Orleans and entered the NAACP's ACT-SO oratorical competitions when he was a teenager. He later earned a bachelor's degree in political science at Xavier.

His master's degree in divinity was earned from Eden Theological Seminary and his doctorate in ministry from Duke University.

== Career ==
Wilson worked for the United Way, which led to him moving to St. Louis, Missouri.

In 2008, Wilson took over as pastor for St. John's Church, an interracial, inner city United Church of Christ congregation in St. Louis. Wilson was the fourteenth pastor and the second Black pastor to lead the church since its founding in 1855 by German immigrants. In 2012, Wilson joined with other Missouri faith leaders to advocate for a ballot initiative to regulate payday lending in Missouri. In 2011, while serving as pastor of St. John's, Wilson became president and CEO of the Deaconess Foundation in St. Louis.

When Michael Brown was killed by police in 2014, St. John's Church was at the forefront of the peaceful protests that followed. As Pastor of St. John's Church, Wilson played a key role in orchestrating the 2014 Freedom rides.

In 2014, Wilson was appointed by Missouri governor Jay Nixon to serve as a co-chair to the Ferguson Commission. The Commission released a report based on the four categories of "Citizen-Law Enforcement Relations", Municipal Courts and Governance", "Child Well-Being and Education Equity", and "Economic Inequality and Opportunity."

Wilson received the Annie Malone Legacy Award in 2019.

In December 2020, Wilson took over as CEO and President of the Children's Defense Fund from founder and civil rights leader Marian Wright Edelman.

In addition to leading the Children's Defense Fund, Wilson serves on the board of: the National Committee for Responsive Philanthropy (chair), the Atlanta-based Forum for Theological Exploration (vice chair), and Grantmakers for Effective Organizations.

Wilson delivered the keynote speech at Duke University's annual Martin Luther King Jr. commemoration in January 2021.

In 2022, Wilson became an inaugural member of NinetyToZero, an initiative founded to address the racial wealth gap in the United States, alongside other philanthropists, business executives, and community leaders.

== Personal life ==
Wilson resides in Washington, D.C., with his wife LaToya and their four children.
