= Prosser Gifford =

American historian, author, and academic administrator (1929–2020)

- Born: May 16, 1929; New York, NY
- Died: July 5, 2020 (aged 91); Woods Hole, MA
- Occupation: Historian
- Title: Dean of Faculty Assistant to President Professor of History Acting Director Chairman Director of Scholarly Programs
- Spouse: Shirley M. Gifford

Academic background
- Education: Yale University, 1951 (B.A.), 1964 (PhD) Merton College, Oxford, Rhodes Scholar, 1953 (B.A.), 1958 (M.A.) Harvard Law School, 1956

Academic work
- Discipline: African History, U.S. Foreign Policy
- Institutions: Amherst College Swarthmore College, Yale University, Woodrow Wilson International Center for Scholars Merton College Charitable Corporation Library of Congress

Prosser Gifford was a historian, author, and academic administrator. He held various positions at notable academic institutions including the position of first Dean of Faculty at Amherst College. He is probably best known for his work as Director of Scholarly Programs at the Library of Congress. He contributed numerous works to the fields of African History and U.S. Foreign Policy.

== Education ==
Prosser attended Buckley School (New York City) and Hotchkiss School in Lakeville, CT. He excelled at Hotchkiss; he graduated in only three years and won a prize for best essay in his second year. He played soccer, hockey, and football, as well as ran track, a sport that he continued well into his adult life. He won the alumni award in 2010, and served later as a trustee for the school.

For his undergraduate education Prosser attended Yale College and graduated with a degree in English Literature in 1951. He rowed crew his sophomore and junior years (1949–50), was editor at Et Veritas, a literary magazine, was included in Phi Beta Kappa Honor Society, and won numerous academic awards (Andrew D. White Prize, 1949; Hart Lyman Prize, 1950; Alpheus Henry Snow Prize, 1951). Upon graduation Prosser was selected as a Rhodes Scholar. He spent the next two years at Merton College in Oxford, reading for a degree in English. His time at Merton made a lasting impression on him, and he chose later to serve as the President of the Merton College Charitable Corporation (MC3) from 1998 to 2006.

Upon returning to the United States, Prosser attended Harvard Law School and graduated with a law degree in 1956. While at law school he married Shirley (DeeDee) Mireille O'Sullivan, whom he'd known since childhood. They met at a regatta in Woods Hole, MA at the age of 11. Upon graduating from law school his first daughter Barbara was born. He then accepted a two-year position as assistant to the president at Swarthmore College where his second daughter, Paula, was born. His third daughter, Heidi, was born three years later.

After his work at Swarthmore, Prosser returned to his student status to pursue a PhD in history at Yale University. As part of completing this PhD he moved with his family to Lusaka, Northern Rhodesia during the time when it was becoming Zambia, where his children attended elementary school and his wife Deedee helped teach Physical Education in local schools. In Lusaka he conducted research at the national archives, supported in part by a generous fellowship he received in 1963 from the Foreign Area Program of the Ford Foundation. His dissertation, completed in 1964, was titled: The Framework for a Nation: An Economic and Social History of Northern Rhodesia from 1914 to 1939.

== Career ==
=== Academia ===
Right after completing his PhD, Prosser was hired by Yale as an assistant professor in African History where he taught both undergraduates and graduates. Perhaps most significantly at this early point in his academic career, Prosser was appointed in 1965 as the Founding Director of President Kingman Brewster Jr.'s 5-Year B.A. Program, where students were able to take a year abroad for an internship, enriching their studies.

Then in 1967, upon the personal invitation of President Calvin Plimpton of Amherst College, Prosser left Yale to become the first Dean of Faculty at Amherst College. In an interview with Robert C. Townsend he recounts that one rainy afternoon, a large man in a dripping poncho arrived in his office at Yale and says, "Hello I'm Cal Plimpton and I believe in Education and I think you believe in education." After accepting the position, he learned that though he had no connections to Amherst, he was offered the job over three of his senior colleagues. He served as first Dean of Faculty from 1967 to 1979 which were tumultuous and informative years at the college. There was only 1 woman on faculty when he arrived and 26 when he departed in 1979. In addition, he helped to co-educate Amherst, as well as 4 other institutions including Concord Academy. Moreover, Prosser substantially contributed to the development of the 5-College system in the region, and as Dean of Faculty shepherded Amherst through the Civil Rights takeover at the college in 1970. His administrative prowess was highly respected and widely known. His skills in this realm put him on the short list of candidates for Yale University's search for a new president in 1977.

=== Woodrow Wilson Center ===
In 1979 Prosser left Amherst to become the deputy director of the Woodrow Wilson International Center for Scholars, now the Wilson Center. He served as deputy director for 9 years until 1987, when he was named acting director until 1988. It was there that he practiced his skills of facilitating conversation and demonstrated his love of learning. He brought together scholars from around the world to collaborate with the Wilson Center, be it research, writing, discussions, symposiums, etc. He aided with their published works, including the Wilson Quarterly and publications of various conferences/conversations.

=== Library of Congress ===
In 1988 Prosser assumed a position created for him at the Library of Congress: the Director of Scholarly Programs. While there he upheld his tenets of scholarly excellence and fruitful open dialogue, again bringing scholars together from around the world. He organized symposia and conversations, including "Frontiers of the Mind in the Twenty-first Century" and "The Rule of Law in a Changing World Order," and an End of World War II anniversary conversation which aired on C-Span. In 1995 he organized an exhibit on French Culture which brought 207 French books and manuscripts to the U.S., many of which America had never seen before. In addition, he was the founding director of the John W. Kluge Center, created in 2000. He established councils, appointed chairs, identified additional resources for junior fellows and supervised the selection process of their Kluge Prize for Achievement in the Study of Humanity. Part of Prosser's research for establishing the Kluge Prize selection process included a trip to Stockholm to talk with those involved in the selection process of the Nobel Prize, as the Kluge prize is a similar award recognizing intellectual disciplines not covered by the Nobel Prizes.

== Community involvement ==
After his retirement in 2005 he stayed busy, serving on the board of various academic and charitable institutions. He moved from Washington, D.C., to his family home in Woods Hole, MA until his death in 2020. There, he established himself as a dedicated community member. He served as:

- Chairman of the Board of Trustees at Marine Biological Laboratory (MBL)
- Honorary Member of the Corporation of the Woods Hole Oceanographic Institution (WHOI)
- President of the Woods Hole Public Library
- Trustee, Hotchkiss School
- President of the Merton College Charitable Corporation (MC3)

He also contributed in varying capacities to other organizations including Falmouth Chorale, Falmouth Academy, Highfield Hall, Quisset Yacht Club, and Church of the Messiah.

== Published works ==
- Britain and Germany in Africa: Imperial Rivalry and Colonial Rule, Ed. with Wm. Roger Louis. With the assistance of Alison Smith (1967).
- France and Britain in Africa: Imperial Rivalry and Colonial Rule. Ed. with Wm. Roger Louis (1971).
- The National Interests of the United States in Foreign Policy: Seven Discussions at the Wilson Center, December, 1980 (1981).
- The Transfer of Power in Africa: Decolonization, 1940–1960, Ed. with Wm. Roger Louis (1982).
- The Treaty of Paris (1783) in a Changing States System: Papers from a Conference, January 26–27, 1984 (1985).
- The Search for Peace and Unity in the Sudan. Ed. with Francis Mading Deng (1987).
- Decolonization and African Independence: The Transfers of Power, 1960–1980, Ed. with Wm. Roger Louis (1988).
- Creating French Culture: Treasures from the Bibliothèque Nationale de France with Marie-Hélène Tesnière (1995).
- Democracy and the Rule of Law. Ed. with Norman Dorsen (2001).
