= Marian Wright Edelman =

American activist for children's rights (born 1939)

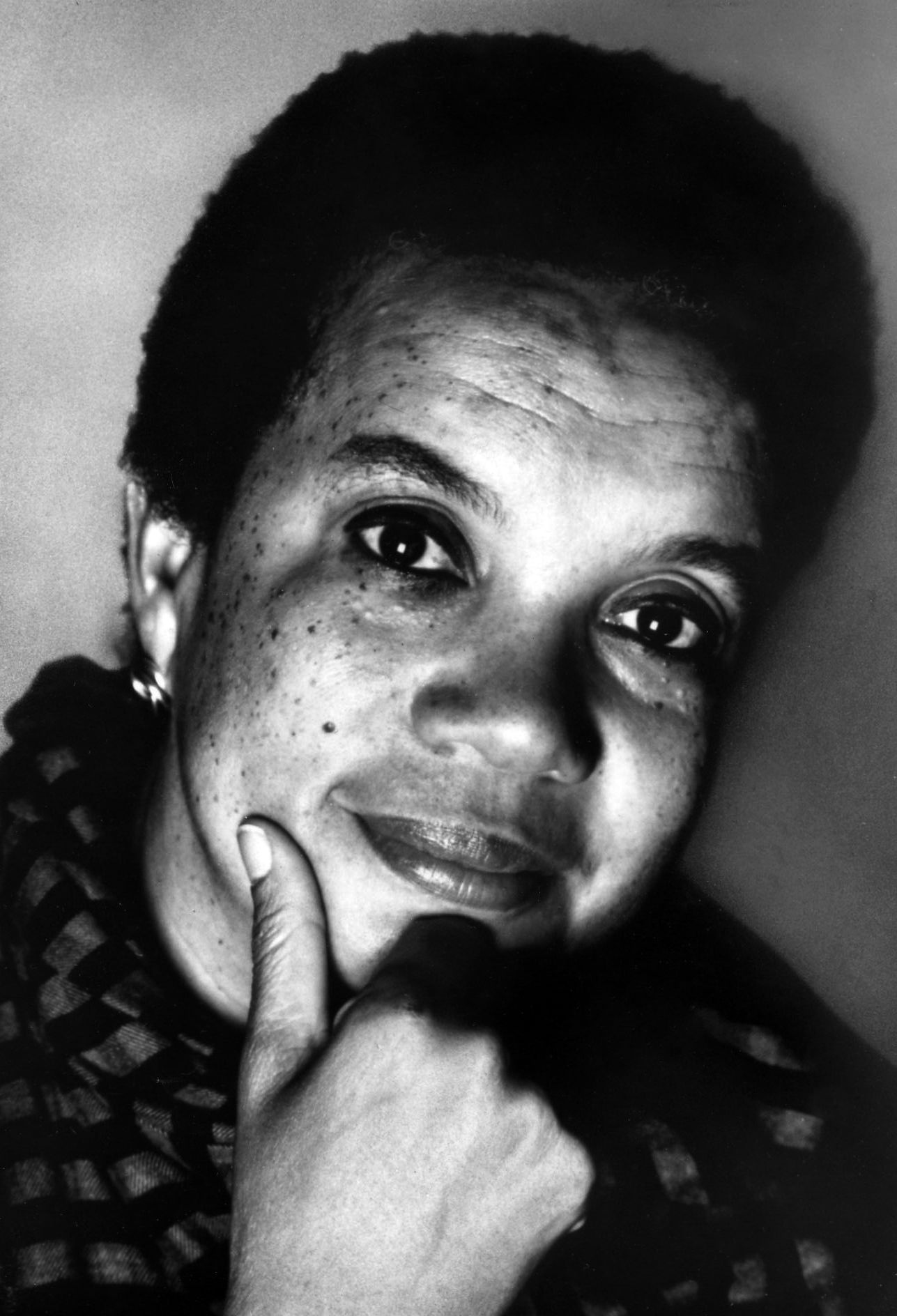
- Edelman in 1994
- Born: Marian Wright; June 6, 1939 (age 87); Bennettsville, South Carolina, U.S.
- Education: Spelman College (BA); Yale University (LLB)
- Occupation: Children's rights activist
- Organization: Children's Defense Fund
- Spouse: Peter Edelman (m. 1968)
- Children: 3, including Jonah and Ezra

Marian Wright Edelman (née Wright; born June 6, 1939) is an American activist for civil rights and children's rights. She is the founder and president emerita of the Children's Defense Fund. She influenced leaders such as Martin Luther King Jr. and Hillary Clinton.

== Early life ==
Marian Wright was born June 6, 1939, in Bennettsville, South Carolina. Her father was Arthur Jerome Wright, a Baptist minister, and her mother was Maggie Leola Bowen. Marian's father encouraged her education before he died, after a heart attack in 1953, when she was 14.

=== Education ===
She went to Marlboro Training High School in Bennettsville, where she graduated in 1956, going on to Spelman College in Atlanta, Georgia.

Due to her academic achievement, she was awarded a Merrill scholarship which allowed her to travel and study abroad. She studied French civilization at the Sorbonne University and at the University of Geneva in Switzerland. For two months during her second semester abroad she studied in the Soviet Union as a Lisle Fellow.

In 1959 she returned to Spelman for her senior year and became involved in the Civil Rights Movement. In 1960 she was arrested along with 77 other students during a sit-in at segregated Atlanta restaurants. She graduated from Spelman as valedictorian. She went on to study law and enrolled at Yale Law School where she was a John Hay Whitney Fellow, and earned a Bachelor of Laws in 1963. She is a member of Delta Sigma Theta sorority.

Edelman received an honorary doctorate from La Salle University in May 2018.

== Activism ==
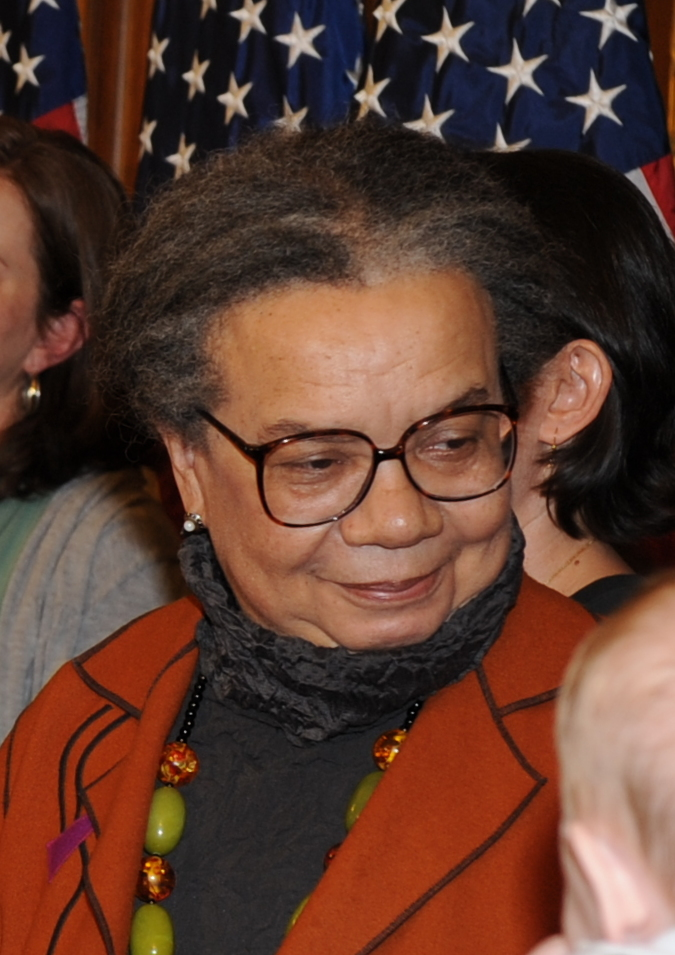
Edelman in 2010

Edelman was the first African-American woman admitted to The Mississippi Bar in 1965. She began practicing law with the NAACP Legal Defense and Educational Fund's Mississippi office, working on racial justice issues connected with the civil rights movement and representing activists during the Mississippi Freedom Summer of 1964. She also helped establish the Head Start program, in particular the Child Development Group of Mississippi [CDGM], a contentious Head Start program serving Black children in Mississippi and resisted by Senators Eastland and Stennis, threatening the overall funding of Head Start. Sargeant Shriver fought back against the senators’ threats, and both Head Start and CDGM survived .

Edelman moved in 1968 to Washington, D.C., where she continued her work and contributed to the organizing of the Poor People's Campaign of Martin Luther King Jr. and the Southern Christian Leadership Conference. She founded the Washington Research Project, a public interest law firm, and also became interested in issues related to childhood development and children.

Edelman was the first Black woman elected to the Yale Corporation, the university's board of trustees, in 1971.

In 1973, she founded the Children's Defense Fund as a voice for poor children, children of color, and children with disabilities. The organization has served as an advocacy and research center for children's issues, documenting the problems and possible solutions to children in need. She also became involved in several school desegregation cases and served on the board of the Child Development Group of Mississippi, which represented one of the largest Head Start programs in the country.

As leader and principal spokesperson for the CDF, Edelman worked to persuade United States Congress to overhaul foster care, support adoption, improve child care and protect children who are disabled, homeless, abused or neglected. As she expresses it, "If you don't like the way the world is, you have an obligation to change it. Just do it one step at a time." Under Edelman's leadership, the CDF also worked on the Children's Health Insurance Program (CHIP).

She continues to advocate youth pregnancy prevention, child-care funding, prenatal care, greater parental responsibility in teaching values and curtailing what she sees as children's exposure to the barrage of violent images transmitted by mass media. Several of Edelman's books highlight the importance of children's rights. In her 1987 book titled Families in Peril: An Agenda for Social Change, Edelman stated: "As adults, we are responsible for meeting the needs of children. It is our moral obligation. We brought about their births and their lives, and they cannot fend for themselves." Edelman serves on the board of the New York City-based Robin Hood Foundation, a charitable organization dedicated to the elimination of poverty.

In 2020, Edelman became president emerita of the Children's Defense Fund, and Starsky Wilson began to head the organization.

In October 2021, Edelman unsuccessfully wrote in support of an extended child tax credit, stating that “we must reject any leaders who for any reason play political football with our children’s lives and our nation’s future” continuing to further advocate for children.

== Personal life ==
Edelman is a member of The Links.

During Joseph S. Clark's and Robert F. Kennedy's tour of the Mississippi Delta in 1967, she met Peter Edelman, an assistant to Kennedy. They married on July 14, 1968, as the third interracial couple to marry in Virginia after the state's anti-miscegenation laws were struck down by the Supreme Court of the United States in Loving v. Virginia. Edelman and her husband, now a Georgetown law professor, have three children: Joshua, Jonah, and Ezra. Joshua is an educational administrator; Jonah works in education advocacy and founded Stand for Children; Ezra is a television producer and director who won an Academy Award for his documentary O.J.: Made in America.

== Honors and awards ==
- 1982: Candace Award, National Coalition of 100 Black Women
- 1985: MacArthur Fellowship
- 1985: Barnard Medal of Distinction
- 1986: Doctor of Laws, honoris causa Bates College
- 1988: Albert Schweitzer Prize for Humanitarianism
- 1991: Award for Greatest Public Service Benefiting the Disadvantaged, an award given out annually by Jefferson Awards.
- 1991: member of the American Academy of Arts and Sciences
- 1992: Boy Scouts of America, Silver Buffalo Award
- 1993: National Women's Hall of Fame
- 1993: Golden Plate Award of the American Academy of Achievement
- 1994: member of the American Philosophical Society
- 1995: Community of Christ International Peace Award
- 1996: Heinz Award in the Human Condition
- 2000: Presidential Medal of Freedom
- 2004: The National Women's History Project named her one of their Women's History Honorees, "2004: Women Inspiring Hope and Possibility"
- 2009: Honorary Doctor of Humane Letters (L.H.D.) from Whittier College
- 2010: A Marlboro County library named in her honor in her hometown of Bennettsville, South Carolina.
- 2011: Rathbun Visiting Fellow at Stanford University
- 2016: Thomas Jefferson Foundation Medal in Citizen Leadership
- 2017: Received Doctor of Humane Letters as an honorary degree from Ohio State University
- 2022: Received the Daniel Patrick Moynihan Prize from the American Academy of Political and Social Science

== Selected works ==
- Winson and Dovie Hudson's Dream. Cambridge: Harvard University. 1975. OCLC 49643782.
- American Children and Families. Washington, D.C.: Religious Action Center. 1981. OCLC 7968448.
- Families in Peril: An Agenda for Social Change. Cambridge: Harvard University Press. 1987. ISBN 0-674-29228-6.
- The Measure of Our Success. Boston: Beacon Press. 1992. ISBN 0-8070-3102-X.
- Kids and Guns: A National Disgrace. Washington, D.C.: Educational Fund To End Handgun Violence. 1993. OCLC 32644803.
- Guide My Feet. Boston: Beacon Press. 1995. ISBN 0-8070-2308-6.
- Edelman, Marian Wright; Adrienne Yorinks (1998). Stand for Children. New York: Hyperion Books for Children. ISBN 0-7868-0365-7.
- Lanterns: A Memoir of Mentors. Boston: Beacon Press. 1999. ISBN 0-8070-7214-1.
- The State of America's Children. Boston: Beacon. 2000. OCLC 46480964.
- I'm Your Child, God: Prayers for Children and Teenagers. New York: Hyperion. 2002. ISBN 0-7868-0597-8.
- I Can Make a Difference: A Treasury to Inspire Our Children. New York: HarperCollins. 2005. ISBN 0-06-028051-4.
- The Sea Is so Wide and My Boat Is so Small. New York: Hyperion. 2008. ISBN 978-1-4013-2333-2.

== See also ==
- List of first women lawyers and judges in Mississippi
