= Stand for Children =

American education advocacy group

- Founded: 1996
- Founder: Jonah Edelman
- Region served: Arizona, Colorado, Illinois, Indiana, Oregon, Tennessee, Washington
- Key people: Jonah Edelman, co-founder and CEO
- Website: stand.org

Stand for Children is an American education advocacy group. Founded in 1996 following a Children's Defense Fund rally, the non-profit advocates for equity in public education. Stand for Children's mission is as "a unique catalyst for educational success and social progress, to create a brighter future for us all."

The organization includes both a 501(c)(4) advocacy organization called Stand for Children, as well as a 501(c)(3) training organization called Stand for Children Leadership Center.

== History ==
On June 1, 1996, over 300,000 people rallied in Washington, D.C., for "Stand for Children Day" at the Lincoln Memorial. This event was the largest demonstration in support of children in U.S. history. Rosa Parks made a statement that challenged people to commit themselves to improving the lives of children, saying, "If I can sit down for justice, you can stand up for children." Two days later, Time featured a cover with the headline, "Who Speaks for Kids?," and an interview with children's activist Marian Wright Edelman, the mother of Stand for Children's CEO and co-founder, Jonah Edelman.

Following their work at the rally, Jonah Edelman and Eliza Leighton founded Stand for Children. The organization backed hundreds of rallies nationwide over the next two years, before moving toward more systemic changes. Today, Jonah Edelman is the CEO of Stand for Children and Eliza Leighton is a member of the Board of Directors of Stand for Children Leadership Center.

Stand for Children opened a series of affiliates around the United States that have a local focus. Over time, Stand began focusing on statewide issues—particularly public education funding.

== Affiliate offices ==
Currently, Stand for Children has seven state affiliates: Arizona, Colorado, Illinois, Indiana, Oregon, Tennessee, and Washington. The affiliates are supported by the national office in Portland, Oregon. While Stand for Children and Stand for Children Leadership Center are jointly led by CEO Jonah Edelman, they have distinct goals and methods of execution aligned with the sections of the federal tax code under which they are each described. Stand for Children, which is described under section 501(c)(4) is a grassroots advocacy group that operates at the local and state level to convince elected officials and voters to pass education reforms. Stand for Children Leadership Center is a section 501(c)(3) organization that provides training on children's advocacy.

In 2011, Stand for Children was praised in Time for "delivering results and changing how politicians think about grassroots education reform." The praise was attributed to the group's work to improve school funding in Oregon, teacher evaluations in Colorado, and teacher policy in Illinois.

== Activity ==
Stand for Children was the top donor in support of Measure 98 in Oregon in 2016, which provided funding for dropout prevention and post-secondary assistance. In 2020, it supported Proposition 208 in Arizona to provide funding for hiring teachers and social workers as well as for career and technical education courses. Stand for Children is controversial among educators and education advocates. It has stood in opposition to unions, and critics accuse it of eroding workers' protections.

== See also ==
- Geoffrey Canada
