= Jan Deutsch =

American lawyer (1935–2016)

Jan G. Deutsch
- Born: May 25, 1935; Katowice, Silesia, Poland
- Died: May 19, 2016 (aged 80); New Haven, Connecticut, U.S.
- Education: Yale University
- Occupation: Legal scholar
- Spouse: Elizabeth Dempsey

Jan Ginter Deutsch (May 25, 1935 – May 19, 2016) was a Polish-born American philosopher and legal scholar best known for his work on the philosophy of corporate law, jurisprudence, and the cultural underpinnings of capitalist democracy. Deutsch's most recent book, Power and Precedent (Vandeplas, 2007), is a summation of his work on United States jurisprudence over the past few decades.

== Biography ==
He was born in Katowice, Silesia, Poland.

Deutsch was a long-time professor in Yale Law School, and at the time of his death was Walton Hale Hamilton Professor of Law Emeritus and Professorial Lecturer at that school. He received a B.A. (Alpheus Henry Snow Prize and Warren Memorial High Scholarship Prize), Ph.D., and J.D. from Yale, after which he clerked with U.S. Supreme Court justice Potter Stewart. He practiced law at Jones, Day, Cockley & Reavis in Cleveland from 1964 to 1966 (with future Supreme Court justice Antonin Scalia) before joining the Yale Law faculty in 1966. Deutsch's two most famous published works are Selling the People's Cadillac: The Edsel and Corporate Responsibility (Yale University Press, 1976), a diagnosis of social ills as seen through the lens of a failed automobile, and a 1969 article, "Neutrality, Legitimacy, and the Supreme Court: Some Intersections Between Law and Political Science," 20 Stan. L. Rev. 169, on fundamental rights vs. opinions.

Former President Bill Clinton wrote, in his autobiography, of Deutsch: "He was the only man I'd ever met who ate all of an apple, including the core. He said all the good minerals were there. He was smarter than I was, so I tried it. Once in a while, I still do, with fond memories of Professor Deutsch."

Deutsch died on May 19, 2016, at the age of 80.

== See also ==
- List of American philosophers
- List of law clerks for the eighth seat of the Supreme Court of the United States
