= United States Senate Select Committee on Nutrition and Human Needs =

The United States Senate Select Committee on Nutrition and Human Needs was a select committee of the United States Senate between 1968 and 1977. It was sometimes referred to as the McGovern committee, after its only chairman, Senator George McGovern of South Dakota.

== Formation and members ==
The impetus for formation of the committee was a rising concern about hunger and malnutrition in the United States. It had been brought to public attention by the 1967 field trip of Senators Robert F. Kennedy and Joseph S. Clark to see emaciated children in Cleveland, Mississippi, by the 1967 broadcast of the CBS News special Hunger in America, and by the 1968 publication of Citizens Crusade Against Poverty's report Hunger USA. The last of which showed that diseases such as kwashiorkor and marasmus – thought only to exist in underdeveloped countries – were present in America.

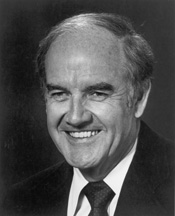
George McGovern, chairman of the committee

Existing Senate and House committees were uninterested in pursuing the issue, with House Agriculture Committee chairman William R. Poage saying "The basic problem is one of ignorance as to what constitutes a balanced diet, coupled with indifference by a great many persons who should and probably do not know," and Senate Agriculture Committee chairman Allen Ellender saying "I know that in my state we had a number of fishermen who were unable to catch fish. Do you expect the government, because they cannot catch fish, to feed them until the fish are there?" Political activist Robert B. Choate, Jr. first came up with the idea of forming a joint congressional committee to probe the hunger problem. McGovern, who had been involved in food-related issues throughout his congressional career and who had been Director of Food for Peace in the Kennedy administration during the early 1960s, thought that confining the committee to just the more liberal Senate would produce better chances for action. McGovern gathered 38 co-sponsors for the committee's creation, a resolution quickly passed the Senate, and McGovern was named the committee's chairman in July 1968. However, the Senate Rules Committee gave essentially no funding to it that year, so it was inactive; in February 1969, McGovern successfully battled the Rules Committee to restore the normally allocated funding and the select committee's operations began.

Membership of the committee during 1969 and 1970 consisted of eight Democrats and five Republicans, and were:

- George McGovern of South Dakota, chairman
- Allen Ellender of Louisiana
- Herman Talmadge of Georgia
- Ralph Yarborough of Texas
- Philip Hart of Michigan
- Walter Mondale of Minnesota
- Edward M. Kennedy of Massachusetts
- Claiborne Pell of Rhode Island
- Jacob Javits of New York
- Charles Percy of Illinois
- Peter H. Dominick of Colorado
- Marlow Cook of Kentucky
- Robert Dole of Kansas

Later members of the committee included Hubert H. Humphrey of Minnesota, Patrick Leahy of Vermont, Edward Zorinsky of Nebraska, Richard Schweiker of Pennsylvania, Gaylord Nelson of Wisconsin, Henry Bellmon of Oklahoma, Alan Cranston of California, and Mark Hatfield of Oregon.

== Hearings, investigations, and actions ==
The committee's initial goal was to study the problem of hunger and recommend a multi-faceted federal response.

Following the Kennedy-Clark path, McGovern sought to dramatize the problem with an onsite visit and so took the committee to Immokalee, Florida, the base for 20,000 mostly black or Hispanic migrant farm workers. They saw graphic examples of hunger and malnutrition firsthand, but also encountered resistance and complaints about bad publicity from local and state officials. Moreover, local officials were suspected of blocking existing assistance to workers, on the grounds the migrants were "federal people, not Immokalee people." Outside the special committee, McGovern battled the Nixon administration and southerners in Congress during much the next year over an expanded food stamp program; he had to compromise on a number of points, but the legislation signed in 1970 established the principles of free food stamps and a nationwide standard for eligibility. Federal commodity assistance came to Immokalee as well.

The committee worked with others in organizing a White House conference on the issue, which led to the White House Conference on Food, Nutrition, and Health in 1969.

In 1971, McGovern expanded the focus of the committee to look at environmental conditions that affected eating habits. He toured the abandoned, destroyed neighborhoods of The Bronx, New York, and issued a report highly critical of the Federal Housing Administration for failed urban renewal efforts. Further committee involvement by McGovern faded for a while as he became caught up in his opposition to the US involvement in the Vietnam War and in his 1972 U.S. presidential campaign.

Throughout, the select committee held hearings in which it heard from academics, non-governmental organizations, educators, health and nutrition experts, school officials, the medical community, and the public. The committee's work filled many volumes of hearing reports. Staff members on the committee included lawyer Jack Quinn, future diplomat Julia Chang Bloch, and nutritionist D. Mark Hegsted.

Beginning in 1974, McGovern expanded the committee's scope to include national nutrition policy. Now, the committee's focus was not just on not eating enough, but also eating too much.

In January 1977, after having held hearings on the national diet, the McGovern committee issued a new set of nutritional guidelines for Americans that sought to combat leading killer conditions such as heart disease, certain cancers, stroke, high blood pressure, obesity, diabetes, and arteriosclerosis. Titled Dietary Goals for the United States, but also known as the "McGovern Report", they suggested that Americans eat less fat, less cholesterol, less refined and processed sugars, and more complex carbohydrates and fiber. (Indeed, it was the McGovern report that first used the term complex carbohydrate, denoting "fruit, vegetables and whole-grains".) The recommended way of accomplishing this was to eat more fruits, vegetables, and whole grains, and less high-fat meat, egg, and dairy products. While many public health officials had said all of this for some time, the committee's issuance of the guidelines gave it higher public profile.

The committee's "eat less" recommendations triggered strong negative reactions from the cattle, dairy, egg, and sugar industries, including from McGovern's home state. The American Medical Association protested as well, reflecting its long-espoused belief that people should see their doctor for individual advice rather than follow guidance for the public as a whole. Some scientists also thought the committee's conclusions needed further expert review. Others felt that the job of promulgating recommendations belonged to the Food and Nutrition Board of the National Research Council. Under heavy pressure, the committee held further hearings, and issued a revised set of guidelines in late 1977 which adjusted some of the advice regarding salt and cholesterol and watered down the wording regarding meat consumption.

== End ==
The committee had won annual extensions each year, despite some institutional opposition, especially from southern Democrats. During 1977, however, there was a large-scale effort to reform the Senate's overall committee system, which was seen as unwieldy, especially in having some 34 special, select, or joint committees. Intense politicking took place as to which select or special committees would survive, and McGovern and Dole fought hard to preserve the Select Committee on Nutrition and Human Needs. They were unsuccessful, and at the close of 1977 the committee was subsumed as the Subcommittee on Nutrition within the newly retitled United States Senate Committee on Agriculture, Nutrition and Forestry. In reaction, Percy said: "I do not know of another committee which ... had to lay bare its whole soul and have an accountability to the whole Senate, as we have had year after year after year." Senator Edward Brooke said that the select committee had simply lacked external clout because its constituency was poor and not organized, and called its ending "a sad commentary upon the Senate".

== Results and legacy ==
The McGovern committee suffered the usual institutional limitations of select committees, in that they could highlight problems but could not report legislation to the floor. Instead, its members had to support legislation being worked on elsewhere, or find a regular standing committee that would introduce legislation on their behalf. Nevertheless, the committee often overcame these restrictions, and it greatly highlighted the dimensions of the nation's problem with hunger, and its work led to major changes and additions into how federal food assistance programs worked. Towards the end of the committee's lifetime, it had become effectively institutionalized as the key congressional agent in the hunger, food assistance, and nutrition areas.

The committee's work in raising the national understanding of the link between nutrition and chronic disease led to several amendments being passed to the existing National School Lunch Act and Child Nutrition Act.

The McGovern committee guidelines led to reorganization of some federal executive functions to support the related aims and became the predecessor to the more detailed Dietary Guidelines for Americans later issued twice a decade by the Center for Nutrition Policy and Promotion.

Two nutrition authors wrote in 2008 that "Perhaps as much as any single force, the bipartisan Select Committee brought credibility to the hunger and nutrition issues ..." Their conclusion is echoed by three nutrition authors writing in 1986, who said:

More than anything else, it was probably the McGovern committee that sparked the change in public thinking about the American diet. For although it set out to investigate the causes of hunger in the United States, the committee quickly found that malnutrition in this country covers not diseases of deficiency, but also diseases of excess.
