= Alpheus Henry Snow =

American lawyer

- Born: Alpheus Henry Snow; November 8, 1859; Claremont, New Hampshire, U.S.
- Died: August 19, 1920 (aged 60); New York City, New York, U.S.
- Education: Trinity College, Hartford
- Alma mater: Yale, Harvard Law School
- Occupation: Lawyer
- Partner: Margaret Maynard Butler Snow

Alpheus Henry Snow (November 8, 1859 – August 19, 1920) was an American lawyer and scholarly investigator in the field of international law.

== Biography ==
Snow was born in Claremont, New Hampshire, where he was a student at the Stevens High School (New Hampshire) until 1876. Between 1876 and 1877 he studied at Trinity College, Hartford, before entering Yale University. He graduated from Yale in 1879 and then entered Harvard Law School, gaining a Bachelor of Laws degree in 1883.

He initially practiced law in Hartford before moving to Indianapolis, where he joined the firm of McDonald and Butler. Snow married the daughter of his senior partner, Margaret Maynard Butler. After he withdrew from active practice in law, the Snows moved to Washington, D.C., where he joined the American Society of International Law in 1906, and then became involved with the American Society for the Judicial Settlement of International Disputes. Snow is described as being "deeply interested in the movement for international peace from its legal aspect." In 1910 he served as the American delegate to the International Conference on Social Insurance, held at The Hague. The same year he was also elected as a member of the Executive Council of the American Society of International Law.

He died on August 19, 1920, in New York City, New York.

== Alpheus Henry Snow Prize ==
The Alpheus Henry Snow Prize is awarded to the senior at Yale who "through the combination of intellectual achievement, character and personality, shall be adjudged by the faculty to have done the most for Yale by inspiring in his or her classmates an admiration and love for the best traditions of high scholarship." Winners have included F. O. Matthiessen, Prosser Gifford, Eugene V. Rostow, Jake Sullivan, Jan Deutsch, Andre Schiffrin, McGeorge Bundy, Strobe Talbott, Cord Meyer, Maynard Mack, Marvin Krislov, James Gross, Jonah Edelman, Lance Liebman, Peter Beinart, Tali Farhadian, and Justin Lowenthal.

== Bibliography ==
- The Administration of Dependencies: a study of the Evolution of the Federal Empire, with special reference to American Colonial Problems (1902)
- The Question of Aborigines in the Law and Practice of Nations (1918)
- A history of the class of '79 By Yale University. Class of 1879

=== Selected articles ===
- "Neutralization versus Imperialism" American Journal of International Law (1908)
- "The Law of Nations" American Journal of International Law (1912)
- "The American Philosophy of Government and Its Effect on International Relations" American Journal of International Law (1914)
- "The Shantung Question and Spheres of Influence" The Nation, New York (September 20, 1919)
- "A League of Nations According to the American Idea" (a paper read before the American Association for the Advancement of Science, December 30, 1919), published in Advocate of Peace (January 1920)
