= Children's Defense Fund =

U.S. non-profit organization

- Abbreviation: CDF
- Founded: 1973; 53 years ago
- Founder: Marian Wright Edelman
- Type: Nonprofit
- Legal status: Foundation
- Purpose: Child Welfare
- Headquarters: Washington, D.C.
- Location: United States
- President/CEO: Rev. Dr. Starsky Wilson
- Key people: Starsky Wilson, President & CEO
- Revenue: ▲$21,338,231 (2013)
- Expenses: ▲$22,048,162 (2013)
- Website: www.childrensdefense.org

The Children's Defense Fund (CDF) is an American 501(c)(3) nonprofit organization based in Washington, D.C., that focuses on child advocacy and research. It was founded in 1973 by Marian Wright Edelman.

== History ==
The CDF was founded in 1973, citing inspiration from the Civil Rights Movement, with the goal of improving federal policies concerning child welfare and public education systems.

CDF is headquartered in Washington, D.C., and has offices in several states around the country: California, Minnesota, New York, Ohio, Mississippi, South Carolina, Tennessee and Texas. CDF programs operate in 28 states.

== Activities ==
Since its founding, the CDF has lobbied for passing legislation related to its goals including the Education for All Handicapped Children Act in 1975 (now known as the Individuals with Disabilities Education Act) and the Adoption Assistance and Child Welfare Act in 1980. Its legislative interests have also included Head Start, Medicaid, Children's Health Insurance Program (CHIP), and the Child Tax Credit.

The CDF has run several public awareness campaigns, including the Adolescent Pregnancy Prevention Campaign in 1986, a gun violence prevention campaign, and ending child poverty.

The CDF's programs include a modern Freedom Schools program launched in 1993 for child enrichment through reading, a Beat the Odds program launched in 1990 that hosts awareness events and awards partial college scholarships, and a Youth Advocacy Leadership Training fund.

In recent years, CDF funds generated numerous child advocacy reports. These reports range in topic, from ending child poverty and minority incarceration rates (and the school to prison pipeline) to gun safety concerning children.

In 2008, the CDF was among the charities receiving donations from the "Idol Gives Back" televised fundraising event.

Numerous notable individuals have been actively involved with the charity. Reese Witherspoon served on the board of directors. J.J. Abrams has funded CDF Freedom Schools in the past.

On September 2, 2020, CDF announced the appointment of Rev. Dr. Starsky Wilson to succeed Marian Wright Edelman as CEO. Wilson began his tenure as president and CEO in December 2020.
