= Social programs in the United States =

The Social Security Administration, created in 1935, was the first major federal welfare agency and continues to be the most prominent.

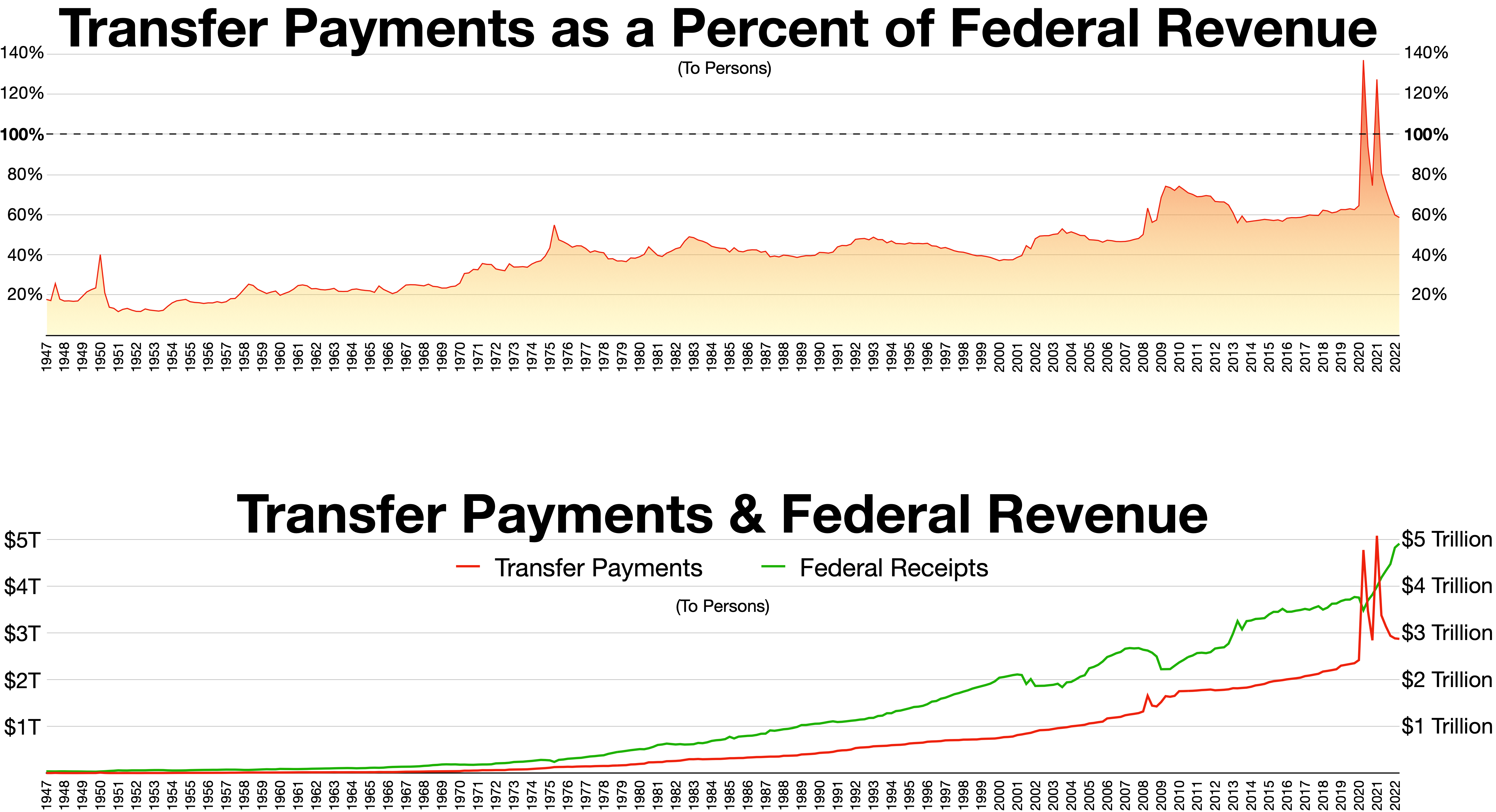
Transfer payments to (persons) as a percent of Federal revenue in the United States

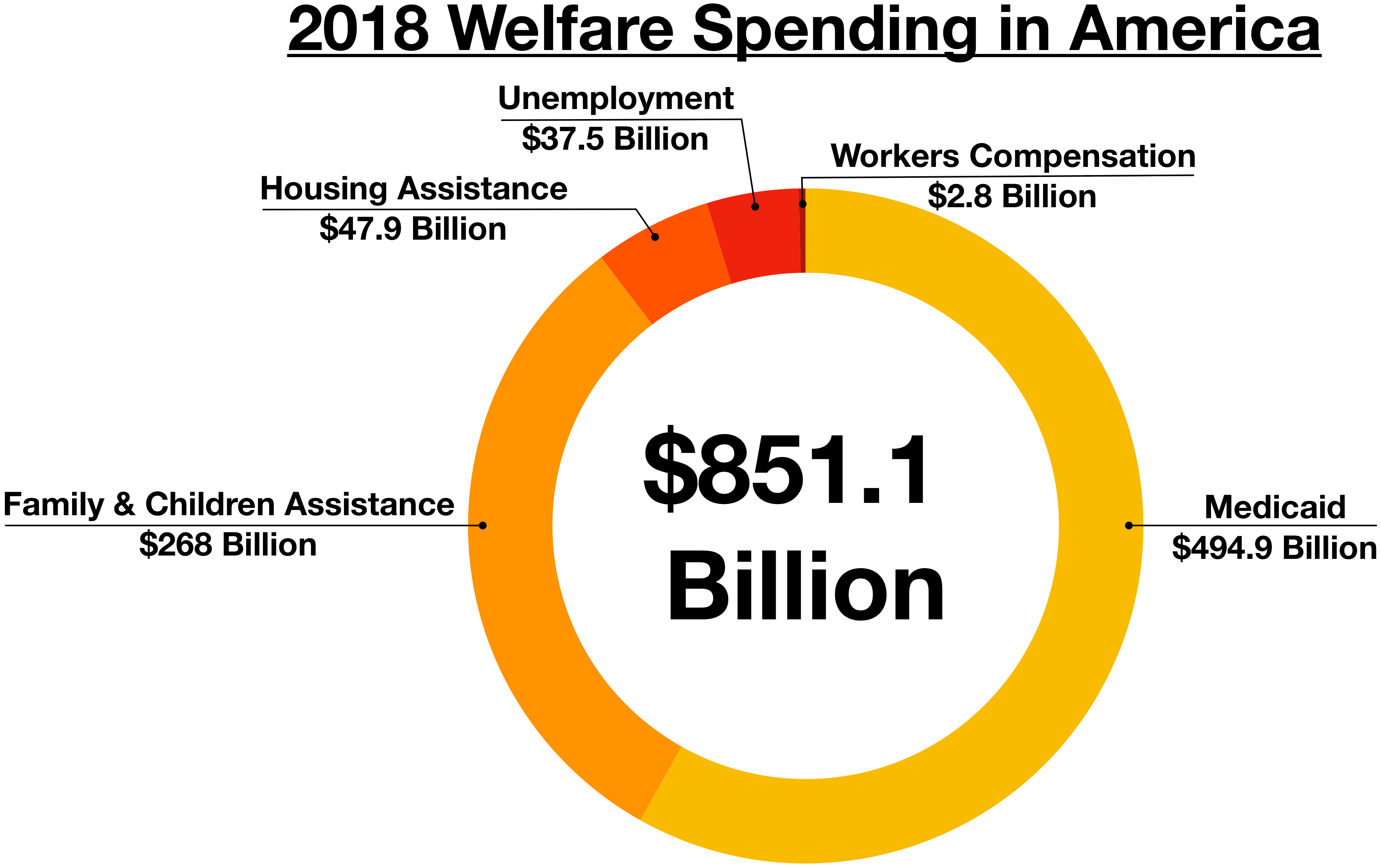
Welfare in America

In the United States, the federal and state social programs include cash assistance, health insurance, food assistance, housing subsidies, energy and utilities subsidies, and education and childcare assistance. Similar benefits are sometimes provided by the private sector either through policy mandates or on a voluntary basis. Employer-sponsored health insurance is an example of this.

American social programs vary in eligibility with some, such as public education, available to all while others, such as housing subsidies, are available only to a subsegment of the population. Programs are provided by various organizations on a federal, state, local, and private level. They help to provide basic needs such as food, shelter, education, and healthcare to residents of the U.S. through primary and secondary education, subsidies of higher education, unemployment and disability insurance, subsidies for eligible low-wage workers, subsidies for housing, Supplemental Nutrition Assistance Program benefits, pensions, and health insurance programs. Social Security, Medicare, Medicaid, and the Children's Health Insurance Program are prominent social programs.

Research shows that U.S. government programs that focus on improving the health and educational outcomes of low-income children are the most effective, with benefits substantial enough that the government may even recoup its investment over time due to increased tax revenue from adults who were beneficiaries as children. Veto points in the U.S. structure of government make social programs in the United States resilient to fundamental change.

== Congressional funding ==
Not including Social Security and Medicare, Congress allocated almost $717 billion in federal funds in 2010 plus $210 billion was allocated in state funds ($927 billion total) for means tested welfare programs in the United States, of which half was for medical care and roughly 40% for cash, food and housing assistance. Some of these programs include funding for public schools, job training, SSI benefits and medicaid. As of 2011, the public social spending-to-GDP ratio in the United States was below the OECD average.

Total Social Security and Medicare expenditures in 2013 were $1.3 trillion, 8.4% of the $16.3 trillion GNP (2013) and 37% of the total Federal expenditure budget of $3.684 trillion.

In addition to government expenditures, private welfare spending, i.e. social insurance programs provided to workers by employers, in the United States is estimated to be about 10% of the U.S. GDP or another $1.6 trillion, according to 2013 OECD estimates. In 2001, Jacob Hacker estimated that public and private social welfare expenditures constituted 21% and 13–14% of the United States' GDP respectively. In these estimates of private social welfare expenditures, Hacker included mandatory private provisions (less than 1% of GDP), subsidized and/or regulated private provisions (9–10% of GDP), and purely private provisions (3–4% of GDP).

== History ==
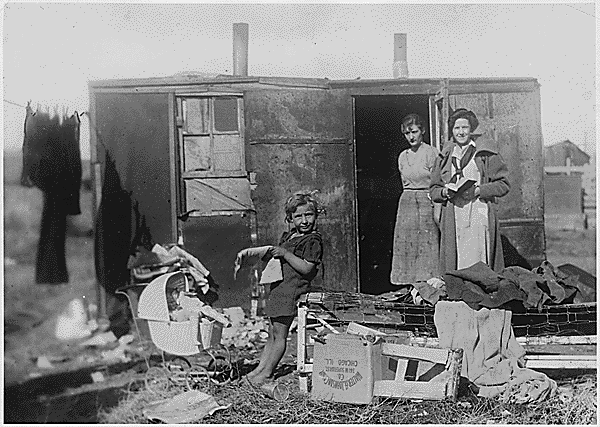
Public health nursing made available through child welfare services, 1935

The first large-scale social policy program in the United States was assistance to Union Civil War veterans. The program provided pensions and disability assistance. From 1890 to the early 1920s, the U.S. provided what Theda Skocpol characterized as "maternalist policies", as it provided pensions for widowed mothers.

Historically, the United States has spent less on social welfare than European countries, but only in terms of gross public social welfare spending. Spending varied between different states in the United States. The United States tended to tax lower-income people at lower rates, and relied substantially on private social welfare programs: "after taking into account taxation, public mandates, and private spending, the United States in the late twentieth century spent a higher share on combined private and net public social welfare relative to GDP than did most advanced economies.".

=== Federal welfare programs ===
Colonial legislatures and later state governments adopted legislation patterned after the English "poor" laws. Aid to veterans, often free grants of land, and pensions for widows and handicapped veterans, have been offered in all U.S. wars. Following World War I, provisions were made for a full-scale system of hospital and medical care benefits for veterans. By 1929, workers' compensation laws were in effect in all but four states. These state laws made industry and businesses responsible for the costs of compensating workers or their survivors when the worker was injured or killed in connection with his or her job. Retirement programs for mainly State and local government paid teachers, police officers, and fire fighters—date back to the 19th century. All these social programs were far from universal and varied considerably from one state to another.

Prior to the Great Depression the United States had social programs that mostly centered around individual efforts, family efforts, church charities, business workers compensation, life insurance and sick leave programs along with some state tax supported social programs. The misery and poverty of the Great Depression threatened to overwhelm all these programs. The severe Depression of the 1930s made Federal action necessary, as neither the states and the local communities, businesses and industries, nor private charities had the financial resources to cope with the growing need among the American people. Beginning in 1932, the Federal Government first made loans, then grants, to states to pay for direct relief and work relief. After that, special Federal emergency relief like the Civilian Conservation Corps and other public works programs were started. In 1935, President Franklin D. Roosevelt's administration proposed to Congress federal social relief programs and a federally sponsored retirement program. Congress followed by the passage of the 37 page Social Security Act, signed into law August 14, 1935 and "effective" by 1939—just as World War II began. This program was expanded several times over the years.

Economic historians led by Price Fishback have examined the impact of New Deal spending on improving health conditions in the 114 largest cities, 1929–1937. They estimated that every additional $153,000 in relief spending (in 1935 dollars, or $2.7 million in 2024 dollars) was associated with a reduction of one infant death, one suicide, and 2.4 deaths from infectious disease.

=== War on Poverty and Great Society programs (1960s) ===
Virtually all food stamp costs are paid by the federal government. In 2008, 28.7 percent of the households headed by single women were considered poor.

=== Welfare reform (1990s) ===
Before the Welfare Reform Act of 1996, welfare assistance was "once considered an open-ended right," but welfare reform converted it "into a finite program built to provide short-term cash assistance and steer people quickly into jobs." Prior to reform, states were given "limitless" money by the federal government, increasing per family on welfare, under the 60-year-old Aid to Families with Dependent Children (AFDC) program. This gave states no incentive to direct welfare funds to the neediest recipients or to encourage individuals to go off welfare benefits (the state lost federal money when someone left the system). Nationwide, one child in seven received AFDC funds, which mostly went to single mothers.

In 1996, under the Clinton administration, Congress passed the Personal Responsibility and Work Opportunity Reconciliation Act, which gave more control of the welfare system to the states, with basic requirements the states need to meet with regards to welfare services. Some states still offer basic assistance, such as health care, food assistance, child care assistance, unemployment, a few offering cash aid, and one or two offering housing assistance, depending on the state and the circumstance. After reforms, which President Clinton said would "end welfare as we know it," amounts from the federal government were given out in a flat rate per state based on population.

Each state must meet certain criteria to ensure recipients are being encouraged to work themselves out of welfare. The new program is called Temporary Assistance for Needy Families (TANF). It encourages states to require some sort of employment search in exchange for providing funds to individuals, and imposes a five-year lifetime limit on cash assistance. The bill makes many legal immigrants ineligible for welfare and increased financial assistance for child care. The federal government also maintains a contingency $2 billion TANF fund (TANF CF) to assist states that may have rising unemployment. The new TANF program expired on September 30, 2010, on schedule with states drawing down the entire original emergency fund of $5 billion and the contingency fund of $2 billion allocated by ARRA. Reauthorization of TANF was not accomplished in 2011, but TANF block grants were extended as part of the Claims Resolution Act of 2010 (see Temporary Aid for Needy Families for details).

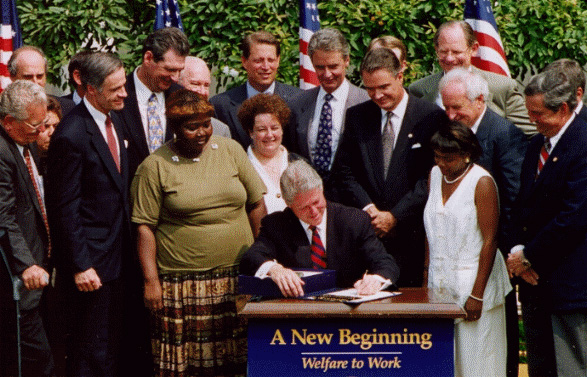
President Bill Clinton signing welfare reform legislation

Following these changes, millions of people left the welfare rolls (a 60% drop overall), employment rose, and the child poverty rate was reduced. A 2007 Congressional Budget Office study found that incomes in affected families rose by 35%. The reforms were "widely applauded" after "bitter protest." The Times called the reform "one of the few undisputed triumphs of American government in the past 20 years." However, more recent studies have found that the reforms increased deep poverty by 130–150%.

Legal immigrants in the United States were impacted in two ways by The Personal Responsibility and Work Opportunity Reconciliation Act (PRWORA). First, it directly denied Medicaid benefits to immigrants entering the US after August 1996. Second, it restricted immigrant access to TANF, which had been a significant indirect pathway to Medicaid enrollment. Together, this led to a significant decrease in immigrants' usage of means-tested programs like TANF, Medicaid, and food stamps following the enactment of the Federal law. This formed negative stigma concerning the usage of welfare benefits as some associated welfare with laziness, taking advantage of the system, and low education. This raised concerns that the stigma associated with PRWORA might have deterred even eligible immigrants from applying for benefits, even though many remain eligible and in dire need of health, nutrition, and other services. These effects originate, among other things, in confusion on the part of immigrants and providers about who is eligible for benefits and in fears of it affecting their immigration status.

A study by the Urban Institute encapsulated this effect on the immigrants in Los Angeles County. Applications that were approved by legal noncitizen families for Medi-Cal and Temporary Assistance for Needy Families dropped 71 percent between January 1996 and January 1998.

Critics of the reforms sometimes point out that the massive decrease of people on the welfare rolls during the 1990s wasn't due to a rise in actual gainful employment in this population, but rather, was due almost exclusively to their offloading into workfare, giving them a different classification than classic welfare recipient. The late 1990s were also considered an unusually strong economic time, and critics voiced their concern about what would happen in an economic downturn.

National Review editorialized that the Economic Stimulus Act of 2009 will reverse the welfare-to-work provisions that Bill Clinton signed in the 1990s, and will again base federal grants to states on the number of people signed up for welfare rather than at a flat rate. One of the experts who worked on the 1996 bill said that the provisions would lead to the largest one-year increase in welfare spending in American history. The House bill provides $4 billion to pay 80% of states' welfare caseloads. Although each state received $16.5 billion annually from the federal government as welfare rolls dropped, they spent the rest of the block grant on other types of assistance rather than saving it for worse economic times.

Spending on largest Welfare Programs Federal Spending 2003–2013^{*}
Federal Programs	Spending 2003^{*}	Spending 2013^{*}
Medicaid and CHIP Grants to States	$201,389	$266,565
Food stamps (SNAP)	61,717	82,603
Earned Income Tax Credit (EITC)	40,027	55,123
Supplemental Security Income (SSI)	38,315	50,544
Housing assistance	37,205	49,739
Child Nutrition Program	13,558	20,842
Support Payments to States, TANF	28,980	20,842
Feeding Programs (WIC & CSFP)	5,695	6,671
Low Income Home Energy Assistance	2,542	3,704
Notes: * Spending in millions of dollars

=== Timeline ===
The following is a short timeline of welfare in the United States:

1880s–1890s: Attempts were made to move poor people from work yards to poor houses if they were in search of relief funds.

1893–1894: Attempts were made at the first unemployment payments, but were unsuccessful due to the 1893–1894 recession.

1932: The Great Depression had gotten worse and the first attempts to fund relief failed. The "Emergency Relief Act", which gave local governments $300 million, was passed into law.

1933: In March 1933, President Franklin D. Roosevelt pushed Congress to establish the Civilian Conservation Corps.

1935: The Social Security Act was passed on June 17, 1935. The bill included direct relief (cash, food stamps, etc.) and changes for unemployment insurance.

1940: Aid to Families With Dependent Children (AFDC) was established.

1964: Johnson's War on Poverty is underway, and the Economic Opportunity Act was passed. Commonly known as "the Great Society"

1996: Passed under Clinton, the "Personal Responsibility and Work Opportunity Reconciliation Act of 1996" becomes law.

2013: Affordable Care Act goes into effect with large increases in Medicaid and subsidized medical insurance premiums go into effect.

== Types ==
=== Means-tested ===
79 Means Tested Programs in U.S. (2011)
Programs	Federal spending^{*}	State spending^{*}	Total spending^{*}
Total cost in (billions) (2011)	$717	$210	$927
Social Security OASDI (2013)			$785
Medicare (2013)			$574
TOTAL all programs (billions)			$2,286
Cash assistance (millions)
SSI/Old Age Assistance	56,462	4,673	61,135
Earned Income Tax Credit (refundable portion)	55,652		55,652
Refundable Child Credit	22,691		22,691
Make Work Pay Tax Credit (Refundable Portion)	13,905		13,905
Temporary Assistance for Needy Families (TANF, old AFDC)	6,883	6,877	13,760
Foster Care Title IVE	4,456	3,921	8,377
Adoption Assistance Title IVE	2,362	1,316	3,678
General Assistance Cash		2,625	2,625
Refugee Assistance	168		168
General Assistance to Native Americans	115		115
Assets for Independence	24		24
Cash total	162,718	19,412	182,130
Medical
Medicaid	274,964	157,600	432,564
SCHIP State Supplemental Health Insurance Program	8,629	3,797	12,426
Medical General Assistance		6,966	6,966
Consolidated Health Center/Community Health Centers	1,481		1,481
Maternal and Child Health	656	492	1,148
Medical Assistance to Refugees	168		168
Healthy Start	104		104
Medical total	289,817	168,855	458,672
Food
Food stamps, SNAP	77,637	6,987	84,624
School Lunch Program	10,321		10,321
WIC Women, Infant and Children Food Program	6,787		6,787
School Breakfast	3,076		3,076
Child Care Food Program	2,732		2,732
Nutrition Program for the Elderly, Nutrition Service Incentives	820	139	959
Summer Program	376		376
Commodity Supplemental Food Program	196		196
TEFAP Temporary Emergency Food Program	247		247
Needy Families	60		60
Farmers' Market Nutrition Program	23		23
Special Milk Program	13		13
Food total	102,288	7,127	109,415
Housing
Section 8 (housing) (HUD)	28,435		28,435
Public Housing (HUD)	8,973		8,973
Low Income Housing Tax Credit for Developers	6,150		6,150
HOME Investment Partnerships Program (HUD)	2,853		2,853
Homeless Assistance Grants (HUD)	2,280		2,280
State Housing Expenditures (from SWE)		2,085	2,085
Rural Housing Insurance Fund (Agriculture)	1,689		1,689
Rural Housing Service (Agriculture)	1,085		1,085
Housing for the Elderly (HUD)	934		934
Native American Housing Block Grants (HUD)	854		854
Other Assisted Housing Programs (HUD)	496		496
Housing for Persons with Disabilities (HUD)	309		309
Housing total	54,058	2,085	56,143
Energy and utilities
LIHEAP Low-Income Home Energy Assistance Program	4,419		4,419
Universal Service Fund Subsidized Low Income Phone Service	1,750		1,750
Weatherization	234		234
Energy and utilities total	6,403		6,403
Education
Pell Grants	41,458		41,458
Title One Grants to Local Education Authorities	14,472		14,472
21st Century Learning Centers	1,157		1,157
Special Programs for Disadvantaged (TRIO)	883		883
Supplemental Education Opportunity Grants	740		740
Adult Basic Education Grants	607		607
Migrant Education	444		444
Gear-Up	303		303
LEAP; Formerly State Student Incentive Grant Program (SSIG)	1		1
Education for Homeless Children and Youth	65		65
Even Start	4		4
Aid for Graduate and Professional Study for Disadvantaged and Minorities	41		41
Education total	60,175		60,175
Training
TANF Work Activities and Training	2,505	832	3,337
Job Corps	1,659		1,659
WIA Youth Opportunity Grants; Formerly Summer Youth Employment	946		946
Senior Community Service Employment	705	78	783
WIA Adult Employment and Training; Formerly JTPA IIA Training for Disadvantaged Adults & Youth	766		766
Food Stamp Employment and Training Program	393	166	559
Foster Grandparents	104	10	114
YouthBuild	110		110
Migrant Training	85		85
Native American Training	52		52
Training total	7,325	1,086	8,411
Services
TANF Block Grant Services	5,385	4,838	10,223
Title XX Social Services Block Grant	1,787		1,787
Community Service Block Grant	678		678
Social Services for Refugees Asylees and Humanitarian Cases	417		417
Safe and Stable Families	553		553
Title III Aging Americans Act	369		369
Legal Services Block Grant	406		406
Family Planning	298		298
Emergency Food and Shelter Program	48		48
Healthy Marriage and Responsible Fatherhood Grants	50		50
Independent Living (Chafee Foster Care Independence Program)	140	28	168
Independent Living Training Vouchers	45		45
Maternal, Infants and Children Home Visitation	36		36
Services total	10,411	4,866	15,278
Child care and child development
Headstart	7,559	1,890	9,449
Childcare and Child Development Block Grant	2,984	2,176	5,160
Childcare Entitlement to the States	3,100		3,100
TANF Block Grant Child Care	2,319	2,644	4,962
Child care and child development total	15,962	6,710	22,671
Community development
Community Development Block Grant and Related Development Funds	7,445		7,445
Economic Development Administration (Dept. of Commerce)	423		423
Appalachian Regional Development	68		68
Empowerment Zones, Enterprise Communities Renewal	1		1
Community development total	7,937		7,937
Total in millions (2011)	$717,093	$210,140	$927,234
Social Security OASDI (2013)			$785,700
Medicare (2013)			$574,200
Grand total (in millions)			$2,287,133

* Spending in millions of dollars

2.3 Trillion Dollar Total of Social Security, Medicare and Means Tested Welfare is low since latest 2013 means tested data not available but 2013, the "real" TOTAL will be higher.

=== Social Security ===
The Social Security program mainly refers to the Old Age, Survivors, and Disability Insurance (OASDI) program, and possibly to the unemployment insurance program. Retirement Insurance Benefits (RIB), also known as Old-age Insurance Benefits, are a form of social insurance payments made by the U.S. Social Security Administration paid based upon the attainment of old age (62 or older).

Social Security Disability Insurance (SSD or SSDI) is a federal insurance program that provides income supplements to people who are restricted in their ability to be employed because of a notable disability.

Unemployment insurance, also known as unemployment compensation, provides for money (from the United States and from the individual states) collected from employers, to workers who have become unemployed through no fault of their own. The unemployment benefits are run by each state with different state-defined criteria for duration, percent of income paid, etc. Nearly all systems require the recipient to document their search for employment in order to continue receiving benefits. Extensions of time for receiving benefits are sometimes offered for extensive work unemployment. These extra benefits usually take the form of loans from the federal government that each state has to repay.

=== General welfare ===
The Supplemental Security Income (SSI) program provides stipends to low-income people who are either aged (65 or older), blind, or disabled.

The Temporary Assistance for Needy Families (TANF) provides cash assistance to indigent American families with dependent children.

=== Healthcare spending ===
Health care in the United States is provided by many separate legal entities. Health care facilities are largely owned and operated by the private sector. Health insurance in the United States is now primarily provided by the government in the public sector, with 60–65% of healthcare provision and spending coming from programs such as Medicare, Medicaid, TRICARE, the Children's Health Insurance Program, and the Veterans Health Administration. Having some form of comprehensive health insurance is statutorily compulsory for most people lawfully residing within the US.

Medicare is a social insurance program administered by the United States government, providing health insurance coverage to people who are aged 65 and over; to those who are under 65 and are permanently physically disabled or who have a congenital physical disability; or to those who meet other special criteria like the End Stage Renal Disease Program (ESRD). Medicare in the United States somewhat resembles a single-payer health care system but is not. Before Medicare, only 51% of people aged 65 and older had health care coverage, and nearly 30% lived below the federal poverty level.

Medicaid is a health program for certain people and families with low incomes and resources. It is a means-tested program that is jointly funded by the state and federal governments, and is managed by the states. People served by Medicaid are U.S. citizens or legal permanent residents, including low-income adults, their children, and people with certain disabilities. Medicaid is the largest source of funding for medical and health-related services for people with limited income in the United States.

The Children's Health Insurance Program (CHIP) is a program administered by the United States Department of Health and Human Services that provides matching funds to states for health insurance to families with children. The program was designed to cover uninsured children in families with incomes that are modest but too high to qualify for Medicaid.

The Alcohol, Drug Abuse, and Mental Health Services Block Grant (or ADMS Block Grant) is a federal assistance block grant given by the United States Department of Health and Human Services. Drug addiction, particularly the use of heroin, is an increasing cause of physical and mental disabilities. Treatment with methadone clinics can be supported by Medicaid and state healthcare programs.

The Trump administration has decided to cut $9 million in Affordable Care Act subsidies by 2018. This action was taken by use of Executive Order 13813, on October 12, 2017. The initial goal had been for Republicans in Congress to use their majority to "repeal and replace" the Affordable Care Act, but they proved unable to do so; therefore, the Trump administration itself took measures to weaken the program. The healthcare changes are expected to be noticeable by the year 2019.

=== Education spending ===
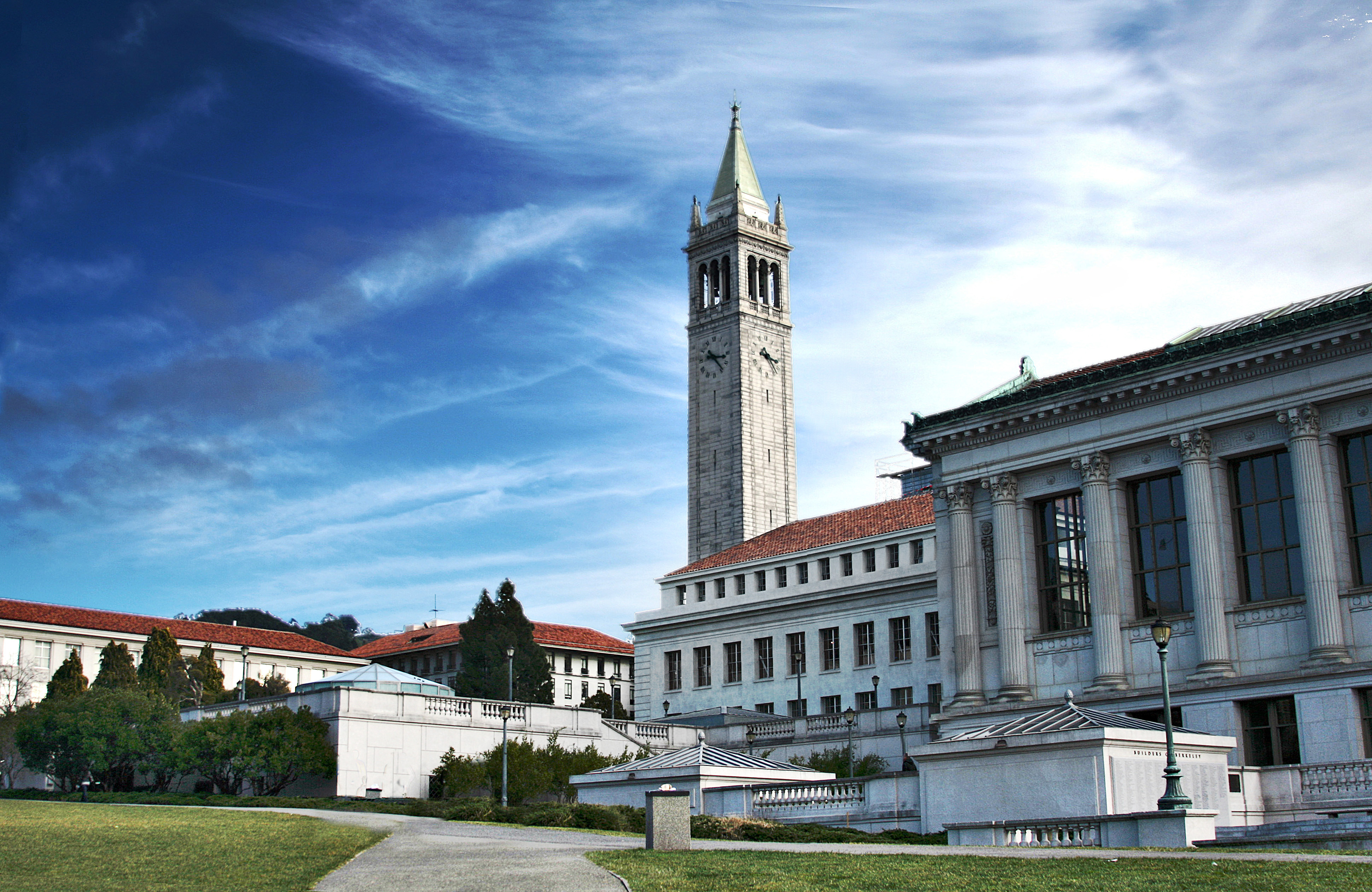
University of California, Berkeley is one of the oldest public universities in the U.S.

Per capita spending on tertiary education is among the highest in the world. Public education is managed by individual states, municipalities and regional school districts. As in all developed countries, primary and secondary education is free, universal and mandatory. Parents do have the option of home-schooling their children, though some states, such as California (until a 2008 legal ruling overturned this requirement), require parents to obtain teaching credentials before doing so. Experimental programs give lower-income parents the option of using government issued vouchers to send their kids to private rather than public schools in some states/regions.

As of 2007, more than 80% of all primary and secondary students were enrolled in public schools, including 75% of those from households with incomes in the top 5%. Public schools commonly offer after-school programs and the government subsidizes private after school programs, such as the Boys & Girls Club. While pre-school education is subsidized as well, through programs such as Head Start, many Americans still find themselves unable to take advantage of them. Some education critics have therefore proposed creating a comprehensive transfer system to make pre-school education universal, pointing out that the financial returns alone would compensate for the cost.

Tertiary education is not free, but is subsidized by individual states and the federal government. Some of the costs at public institutions is carried by the state.

The government also provides grants, scholarships and subsidized loans to most students. Those who do not qualify for any type of aid, can obtain a government guaranteed loan and tuition can often be deducted from the federal income tax. Despite subsidized attendance cost at public institutions and tax deductions, however, tuition costs have risen at three times the rate of median household income since 1982. In fear that many future Americans might be excluded from tertiary education, progressive Democrats have proposed increasing financial aid and subsidizing an increased share of attendance costs. Some Democratic politicians and political groups have also proposed to make public tertiary education free of charge, i.e. subsidizing 100% of attendance cost.

=== Food assistance ===
In the US, financial assistance for food purchasing for low- and no-income people is provided through the Supplemental Nutrition Assistance Program (SNAP), formerly known as the Food Stamp Program. This federal aid program is administered by the Food and Nutrition Service of the U.S. Department of Agriculture, but benefits are distributed by the individual U.S. states. It is historically and commonly known as the Food Stamp Program, though all legal references to "stamp" and "coupon" have been replaced by "EBT" and "card," referring to the refillable, plastic Electronic Benefit Transfer (EBT) cards that replaced the paper "food stamp" coupons. To be eligible for SNAP benefits, the recipients must have incomes below 130 percent of the poverty line, and also own few assets. Since the economic downturn began in 2008, the use of food stamps has increased.

The Special Supplemental Nutrition Program for Women, Infants and Children (WIC) is a child nutrition program for healthcare and nutrition of low-income pregnant women, breastfeeding women, and infants and children under the age of five. The eligibility requirement is a family income below 185% of the U.S. Poverty Income Guidelines, but if a person participates in other benefit programs, or has family members who participate in SNAP, Medicaid, or Temporary Assistance for Needy Families, they automatically meet the eligibility requirements.

The Child and Adult Care Food Program (CACFP) is a type of United States federal assistance provided by the U.S. Department of Agriculture (USDA) to states in order to provide a daily subsidized food service for an estimated 3.2 million children and 112,000 elderly or mentally or physically impaired adults in non-residential, day-care settings.

A RAND study has concluded that almost 70% of the veterans who are older than 70 are food-insecure but are not using government assistance programs.

=== Public housing ===
The Housing and Community Development Act of 1974 created Section 8 housing, the payment of rent assistance to private landlords on behalf of low-income households.

== Impact ==
Average Incomes and Taxes CBO Study 2009^{*}
Households by income (%)	Market income^{1}	Federal transfers ^{2}	Income + transfers	Avg Federal tax rate %^{3}	Federal taxes $^{4}	% Federal taxes pd. ^{5}	#W^{6}	% Net income^{7}
0–20	7,600	22,900	30,500	1.0	200	0.3	0.42	6.2
21–40	30,100	14,800	45,000	6.8	2,900	3.8	0.90	11.1
41–60	54,200	10,400	64,600	11.1	7,200	9.4	1.29	15.8
61–80	86,400	7,100	93,500	15.1	14,100	18.3	1.70	21.6
80–100	218,800	6,000	224,800	23.2	51,900	67.9	1.97	47.2
Source: Congressional Budget Office Study: 1. Market income = All wages, tips, incomes etc. as listed on Income tax form; 2. Federal transfers = All EITC, CTC, Medicaid, food stamps (SNAP), Social Security, SSI etc. received; 3. Average tax rate includes all Social Security, Medicare, income, business income, excise, etc. taxes.; 4. Net federal taxes paid in dollars; 5. Percent of all federal taxes paid; 6. #W = Average number of workers per household in this quintile; 7. % Net Income = percentage of all national income each quintile receives after taxes and transfers.

According to a 2020 study in the Quarterly Journal of Economics, U.S. government programs that focus on improving the health and educational outcomes of low-income children are the most effective, with benefits substantial enough that the government may even recoup its investment over time due to increased tax revenue from adults who were beneficiaries as children.

According to the Congressional Budget Office, social programs significantly raise the standard of living for low-income Americans, particularly the elderly. The poorest 20% of American households earn a before-tax average of only $7,600, less than half of the federal poverty line. Social programs increase such households' before-tax income to $30,500. Social Security and Medicare are responsible for two thirds of that increase.

Political scientist Benjamin Radcliff has argued that more generous social programs produce a higher quality of life for all citizens, rich and poor alike, as such programs not only improve life for those directly receiving benefits (or living in fear of someday needing them, from the prospect of unemployment or illness) but also reduce the social pathologies (such as crime and anomie) that are the result of poverty and insecurity. By creating a society with less poverty and less insecurity, he argues, we move closer to creating a nation of shared prosperity that works to the advantage of all. Thus, his research suggests, life satisfaction (or "happiness") is strongly related to the generosity of the social safety net (what economists often call decommodification), whether looking across the industrial democracies or across the American states.

=== Social impact ===
Complaints of mistreatment in navigating the welfare state are commonplace, with most unpleasant encounters arising from interactions between welfare recipients and social workers. The dominant approach to social work was casework which emphasized the personal characteristics or moral deficiencies of the recipient rather than social reform. In some cases the said deficiency was grounds for denying assistance. Casework fostered a paternalistic and demeaning relationship between social workers and clients. Caseworkers are the persons who have the most opportunity for showing respect or disrespect to the welfare client. Attitudes of welfare clients toward their caseworkers are described not as much in terms of what they receive in their checks but rather in terms of the relationship that they have with their caseworker; a study found that the way in which a client was shown respect was often more important to the client than what the provider in the situation did to solve the client's problems.

As such, there has been work in the private and public sector to target the relationships between social worker and welfare recipients as a way to improve access to social provisions and ease the transition from welfare to work. In a study conducted of the association between the relationship held between people with mental health illnesses who are arrested and sent to mental health court with the mental health court (MHC) caseworker assigned to their case and outcomes, researchers found that perceived conflict with caseworkers was higher in a number of participants who were terminated or missing from MHC. Participants who reported less conflict with an assigned caseworker utilized more services and spent fewer days in jail. The study shows the importance a perceived bond has on a participant's use of services, with less perceived conflict resulting in an increase of service use and program retention and decrease in jail time served. Similar results were found in an evaluation of the impact of eleven different welfare-to-work approaches on adults and children in the course of five years. Two programs who had lower enforcement of the participation mandate compared to the other nine, had little to no impact on employment and earnings if its participants. It appears that a minimum level of involvement and enforcement by program staff is required to produce a moderate improvement in employment—without it, participants who would not participate on their own volition would not engage in the program's activities and reap the benefits from them. Within the same evaluation it was found that programs that appointed one caseworker per person rather than the traditional two, had better outcomes for participants than programs that had assigned two caseworkers per person.

When a social worker demonstrates to her clients by her actions that she respects them, a relationship is able to grow. Clients who feel respected by their social worker will be more likely to freely discuss difficult topics, explore their own contributions, and appoint themselves in efforts to achieve specific outcomes. A client's perception of their provider's level of regard for them was significantly related to their ability to achieve a certain outcome at the end of their program. Respect, although important throughout all phases of service, it is particularly crucial to interactions among newcomers or strangers. Such expressions would include vocal sounds (ex. greeting, calling), physical movements (ex. serving, guiding), bodily movements (acknowledging, polite posture), appearance (ex. proper dressing, grooming), and so forth.

When grievances do need be addressed by the welfare beneficiaries, they usually seek the assistance of a lawyer or advocate. Because advocacy is a practice of speaking for the advocate, no matter how “rebellious” they aspire to be, they inevitably perpetuate the same subordination of their client as the system they attempt to combat. Lucie White presents this point in her “Goldberg v Kelly On the Paradox of Lawyering for the Poor” and proposes that when lawyers are representing poor welfare recipients, lawyers need to continuously cede to “clients” the power to speak for themselves. Such an act would transform the lawyer from a professional service that is imposed upon subordinated communities to partners that allow clients to take the lead of their own advocacy.

== Analysis ==
According to a 2012 review study, whether a social program generates public support depends on:

- whether the program is universal or targeted towards certain groups
- the size of the social program benefits (larger benefits incentivize greater mobilization to defend a social program)
- the visibility and traceability of the benefits (whether recipients know where the benefits come from)
- the proximity and concentration of the beneficiaries (this affects the ease by which beneficiaries can organize to protect a social program)
- the duration of the benefits (longer benefits incentivize greater mobilization to defend a social program)
- the manner in which a program is administered (e.g. is the program inclusive, does it follow principles?)

=== Household characteristics ===
Characteristics of Households by Quintile 2010
Household income Bracket (%)	0–20	21–40	41–60	61–80	81–100
Earners per household	0.4	0.9	1.3	1.7	2.0
Marital status
Married couples (%)	17.0	35.9	48.8	64.3	78.4
Single parents or single (%)	83.0	64.1	51.2	35.7	21.6
Ages of householders
Under 35	23.3	24	24.5	21.8	14.6
36–64 years	43.6	46.6	55.4	64.3	74.7
65 years +	33.1	29.4	20.1	13.9	10.7
Work status householders (%)
Worked full time (%)	17.4	44.7	61.1	71.5	77.2
Worked part time (%)	14.3	13.3	11.1	9.8	9.5
Did not work (%)	68.2	42.1	27.8	17.7	13.3
Education of householders (%)
Less than high school	26.7	16.6	8.8	5.4	2.2
High school or some college	61.2	65.4	62.9	58.5	37.6
Bachelor's degree or higher	12.1	18.0	28.3	36.1	60.3
Source: US Census Bureau

Social programs have been implemented to promote a variety of societal goals, including alleviating the effects of poverty on those earning or receiving low income or encountering serious medical problems, and ensuring retired people have a basic standard of living.

Unlike in Europe, Christian democratic and social democratic theories have not played a major role in shaping welfare policy in the United States. Entitlement programs in the U.S. were virtually non-existent until the administration of Franklin Delano Roosevelt and the implementation of the New Deal programs in response to the Great Depression. Between 1932 and 1981, modern American liberalism dominated U.S. economic policy and the entitlements grew along with American middle class wealth.

Eligibility for welfare benefits depends on a variety of factors, including gross and net income, family size, pregnancy, homelessness, unemployment, and serious medical conditions like blindness, kidney failure or AIDS.

=== Drug testing for applicants ===
The United States adopted the Personal Responsibility and Work Opportunity Act in 1996, which gave individual states the authority to drug test welfare recipients. Drug testing in order for potential recipients to receive welfare has become an increasingly controversial topic. Richard Hudson, a Republican from North Carolina claims he pushes for drug screening as a matter of "moral obligation" and that testing should be enforced as a way for the United States government to discourage drug usage. Others claim that ordering the needy to drug test "stereotypes, stigmatizes, and criminalizes" them without need. States that currently require drug tests to be performed in order to receive public assistance include Arizona, Florida, Georgia, Missouri, Oklahoma, Tennessee, and Utah.

=== Demographics of TANF recipients ===
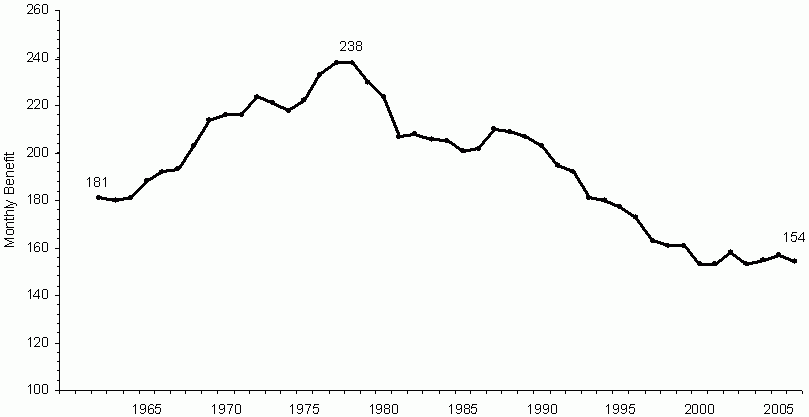
A chart showing the overall decline of average monthly AFDC and TANF benefits per recipient 1962–2006 (in 2006 dollars)

Some have argued that welfare has come to be associated with poverty. Political scientist Martin Gilens argues that blacks have overwhelmingly dominated images of poverty over the last few decades and states that "white Americans with the most exaggerated misunderstandings of the racial composition of the poor are the most likely to oppose welfare". This perception possibly perpetuates negative racial stereotypes and could increase Americans' opposition and racialization of welfare policies.

In FY 2010, African-American families comprised 31.9% of TANF families, white families comprised 31.8%, and 30.0% were Hispanic. Since the implementation of TANF, the percentage of Hispanic families has increased, while the percentages of white and black families have decreased. In FY 1997, African-American families represented 37.3% of TANF recipient families, white families 34.5%, and Hispanic families 22.5%. As of 2013, the US population as a whole is composed of 63.7% whites, 16.3% Hispanic, 12.5% African-American, 4.8% Asian and 2.9% other races. TANF programs at a cost of about $20.0 billion (2013) have decreased in use as Earned Income Tax Credits, Medicaid grants, Supplemental Nutrition Assistance Program benefits, Supplemental Security Income (SSI), child nutrition programs, Children's Health Insurance Program (CHIP), housing assistance, Feeding Programs (WIC & CSFP), along with about 70 more programs, have increased to over $700 billion more in 2013.

=== Costs ===
The Great Recession made a large impact on welfare spending. In a 2011 article, Forbes reported, "The best estimate of the cost of the 185 federal means tested welfare programs for 2010 for the federal government alone is $717 billion, up a third since 2008, according to The Heritage Foundation. Counting state spending of about $210 billion, total welfare spending for 2010 reached over $920 billion, up nearly one-fourth since 2008 (24.3%)"—and increasing fast. The previous decade had seen a 60% decrease in the number of people receiving welfare benefits, beginning with the passage of the Personal Responsibility and Work Opportunity Act, but spending did not decrease proportionally during that time period. Combined annual federal and state spending is the equivalent of over $21,000 for every person living below poverty level in America.

== See also ==
- Administration of federal assistance in the United States
- Entitlement program
- Poverty in the United States
  - History of poverty in the United States
- Wealth inequality in the United States
- Welfare economics
- Welfare in California
- Welfare in Puerto Rico
- Welfare trap
