= WIC Farmers' Market Nutrition Act of 1992 =

Act that established a food aid program in the U.S.

The WIC Farmers’ Market Nutrition Act of 1992 (P.L. 102–314) established a program authorizing projects that provide participants in the Special Supplemental Nutrition Program for Women, Infants, and Children (WIC) with food coupons that can be used to purchase fresh, unprocessed foods, such as fruits and vegetables at farmers’ markets. The program is funded by the USDA and administered by individual state, territory, and tribal governments.

== See also ==
- 1992 in the United States
- Administration of federal assistance in the United States
- Child and Adult Care Food Program
- Child Nutrition Act (1966)
- Farmers' Market Nutrition Program / Senior Farmers' Market Nutrition Program
- Federal Housing Enterprises Financial Safety and Soundness Act of 1992
- Food security
- Housing and Community Development Act of 1992
- National School Lunch Act (1946)
- School Breakfast Program
- Summer Food Service Program
