= Mid-Iowa Narcotics Enforcement =

Undercover drug enforcement task force

The Mid-Iowa Narcotics Enforcement (MINE) Task Force is a federally funded undercover drug enforcement task force, coordinated among several jurisdictions of Iowa law enforcement. MINE is part of the Iowa Division of Narcotics Enforcement and is charged with aggressively combating street level drug dealers, disrupting mid-level to upper-level drug trafficking and manufacturing organizations and dismantling the organizations.
