= Software factory (Microsoft .NET) =

== Implementations ==
- The Enterprise Framework Factory (the EFx Factory) from Microsoft Services was one of the first pioneering architectural software factories to use a unique combination of model driven development, and integrated runtime environment tools to build Service-Oriented Enterprise Applications and Services.
  - EFx Factory Blog
- Microsoft Patterns and Practices Team have developed four software factories:
  - SharePoint Software Factory, for SharePoint 2007/2010 and Visual Studio 2008/2010
  - Smart Client Software Factory, for Visual Studio 2008 (released: April 2008)
  - Web Service Software Factory (released: July 2006, updated December 2006, 2010, a new Service Factory : Modeling Edition version (incompatible with the previous ones) released in November 2007)
  - Mobile Client Software Factory (released: July 2006)
- Project Glidepath is a Micro ISV-oriented Software Factory, also from Microsoft.
  - Project Glidepath Blog
  - Project Glidepath Forums
- NConstruct is Windows and Web rapid enterprise application development tool and environment for .NET Framework environment.

== See also ==
- Software Product Line
