= Drug-related deaths in the United States by state =

== Drug use and deaths per state ==
State	Population (2010)	Drug Users (2010)	Drug Deaths (Total 2010)	Drug Deaths (per 100,000)	Federal Grants (2010)	Grant/Drug User
Alabama	4,779,736	06.73%	554	12	$80,040,503	$248.82
Alaska	710,231	11.79%	75	11	$30,760,934	$367.36
Arizona	6,392,017	08.95%	981	15.5	$138,524,069	$242.36
Arkansas	2,915,918	07.96%	326	11.5	$47,138,163	$203.09
California	37,253,956	09.07%	4178	11.4	$832,107,905	$246.26
Colorado	5,029,196	11.72%	747	15.4	$111,188,470	$188.64
Connecticut	3,574,097	08.23%	444	12.7	$103,493,029	$351.84
Delaware	897,934	09.14%	102	11.8	$24,161,839	$294.40
Florida	18,801,310	07.80%	2936	16.1	$338,129,029	$230.57
Georgia (U.S. state)	9,687,653	07.32%	1043	10.6	$321,114,660	$452.83
Hawaii	1,360,301	09.92%	142	11.1	$37,176,146	$275.50
Idaho	1,567,582	08.00%	133	8.9	$21,076,027	$168.06
Illinois	12,830,632	07.17%	1239	9.6	$234,968,808	$255.41
Indiana	6,483,802	08.79%	827	13.0	$91,020,232	$159.71
Iowa	3,046,355	04.08%	211	7.1	$58,962,185	$474.39
Kansas	2,853,118	06.77%	294	10.6	$40,234,098	$208.30
Kentucky	4,339,367	08.41%	722	17	$100,547,625	$275.52
Louisiana	4,533,372	07.16%	862	20.1	$80,230,847	$247.18
Maine	1,328,361	09.09%	161	12.2	$36,320,286	$300.79
Maryland	5,773,552	07.29%	807	12.7	$192,136,722	$456.50
Massachusetts	6,547,629	08.87%	1003	15.6	$245,061,344	$421.96
Michigan	9,883,640	08.95%	1524	15.3	$243,556,706	$275.33
Minnesota	5,303,925	08.24%	359	6.9	$95,867,509	$219.35
Mississippi	2,967,297	06.39%	334	11.4	$50,554,343	$266.62
Missouri	5,988,927	07.38%	730	12.4	$123,020,244	$278.34
Montana	989,415	10.02%	132	13.8	$28,332,837	$285.79
Nebraska	1,826,341	06.43%	92	5.2	$34,675,170	$295.27
Nevada	2,700,551	09.35%	515	20.1	$46,367,799	$183.63
New Hampshire	1,316,470	12.15%	172	13.0	$55,388,743	$346.29
New Jersey	8,791,894	06.42%	797	9.2	$113,795,702	$201.61
New Mexico	2,059,179	10.07%	447	12.8	$150,896,974	$727.71
New York	19,378,102	09.82%	1797	9.2	$1,875,136,099	$985.39
North Carolina	9,535,483	08.88%	1223	13.0	$403,912,656	$477.01
North Dakota	672,591	05.3%	28	4.3	$36,344,108	$1,019.55
Ohio	11,536,504	07.61%	1691	14.7	$207,925,242	$236.84
Oklahoma	3,751,351	08.09%	687	19	$67,359,062	$221.95
Oregon	3,831,074	12.80%	564	15.1	$104,298,167	$212.69
Pennsylvania	12,702,379	06.57%	1812	14.6	$283,229,043	$339.38
Rhode Island	1,052,567	13.34%	142	13.4	$43,604,718	$310.55
South Carolina	4,625,364	06.70%	584	13.2	$77,790,340	$251.02
South Dakota	814,180	06.28%	34	4.3	$31,840,106	$622.72
Tennessee	6,346,105	08.22%	1035	16.8	$107,211,391	$205.52
Texas	25,145,561	06.26%	2343	9.8	$384,444,836	$244.23
Utah	2,763,885	06.24%	546	20.6	$47,059,651	$272.86
Vermont	625,741	13.73%	57	9.2	$58,913,913	$685.73
Virginia	8,001,024	07.33%	713	9.2	$173,221,243	$295.36
Washington	6,724,540	09.59%	1003	15.5	$130,527,165	$202.40
West Virginia	1,852,994	06.79%	405	22.4	$45,059,469	$358.13
Wisconsin	5,686,986	08.67%	639	11.4	$107,259,369	$217.54
Wyoming	563,626	06.82%	68	13	$12,483,581	$324.76
United States	308,143,815	08.11%	38260	12.4	$8	$.19
