= Mark Carnes =

American historian

Mark Christopher Carnes
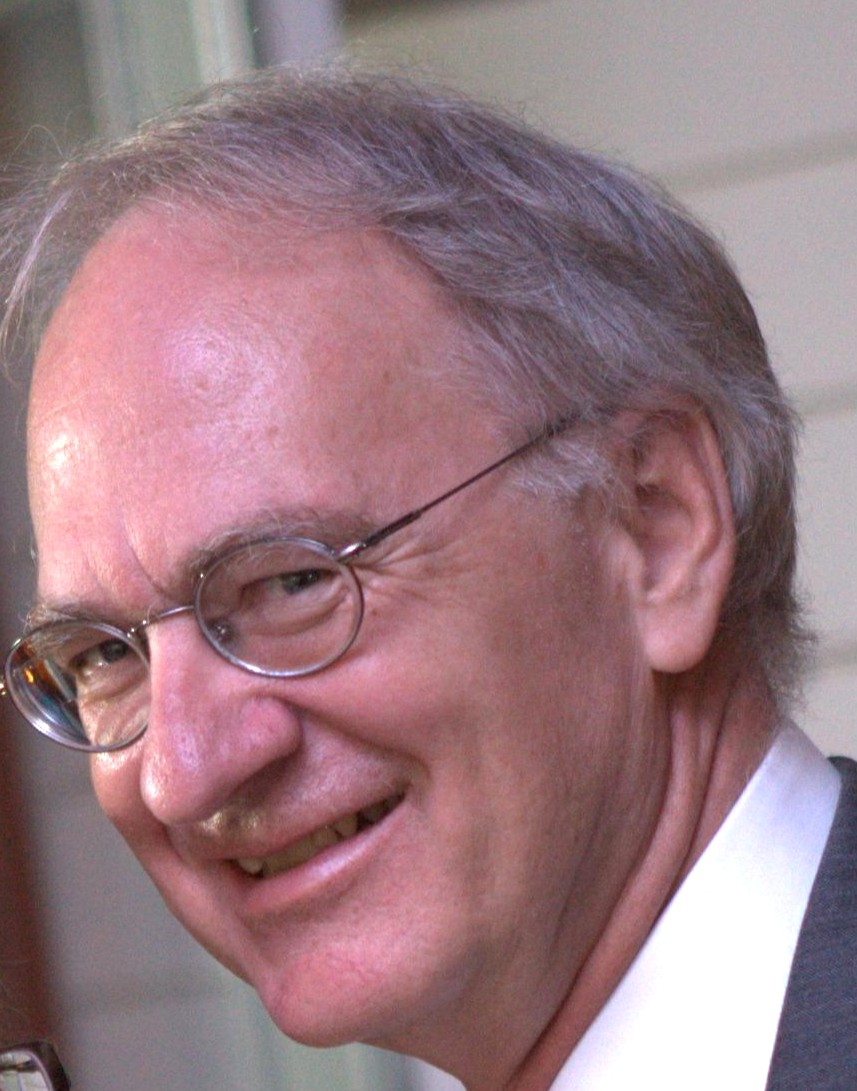
- Born: 1950; Pocatello, Idaho
- Occupations: Historian and educator
- Spouse: Mary Elin Korchinsky (m. 1976)

Academic background
- Education: Newburgh Free Academy (1969); BA., Harvard University (1974); PhD., Columbia University (1982)

Academic work
- Institutions: Barnard College, Columbia University

Mark Christopher Carnes is an American historian and educator best known as the founder of the Reacting to the Past pedagogy.

Carnes earned his Ph.D. from Columbia University in 1982 and joined the faculty of Barnard College, where he has served as professor of history and chaired the department from 1992 to 1995. In 1989 he and John A. Garraty became co-editors of the American National Biography (1999). Later, he developed Reacting to the Past, a classroom pedagogy in which students participate in complex role-playing games informed by historical texts. He contributed to refining the methodology and served as the founding executive director of the Reacting Consortium, the nonprofit that manages its development.

== Early life and education ==
Carnes was born in Pocatello, Idaho, in 1950. His father worked for J.C. Penney. He studied piano at the Eastman School of Music, and attended Newburgh Free Academy, where he met Mary Elin Korchinsky, his future partner and collaborator. Both graduated in 1969 and later married in 1976.

Carnes earned a B.A. in history in 1974 and subsequently directed the Orange County Nutrition Program for the Elderly. In 1976, he entered the doctoral program in history at Columbia University. While completing his studies, he was appointed Orange County Historian in 1980 and served as a visiting assistant professor of history at Vassar College in 1981. He received his Ph.D. from Columbia in 1982.

== Career ==
By the late 1990s, Carnes began developing classroom simulations to increase student engagement in his first-year seminar on great texts. These eventually evolved into month-long role-playing games set in historical contexts such as Athens after the Peloponnesian War, Ming China, Puritan Boston, revolutionary France, and pre-independence India, forming the basis for Reacting to the Past. He was appointed the first executive director of the Reacting Consortium in 2013, a position he held until stepping down in 2022.

Earlier in his career, Carnes succeeded Kenneth Jackson as executive secretary of the Society of American Historians (SAH) in 1991. During his tenure, he served as general editor of Past Imperfect: History According to the Movies (1995) and edited Invisible Giants: Fifty Americans Who Shaped the Nation but Missed the History Books (2002). He resigned as SAH executive secretary in 2009 but continued to serve on its board.

== Works ==
Early in his career, Carnes worked on several editorial projects, including The Compensations of War: The Diary of an Ambulance Driver during the Great War (1983) and the Dictionary of American Biography, Supplements 8–9 (1988), co-edited with John Garraty. His first monograph, Secret Ritual and Manhood in Victorian America (1989), argued that middle-class men, responding to the feminization of religion and women's central role in childrearing, turned to fraternal organizations such as the Freemasons and Odd Fellows. These groups, through elaborate initiatory rituals, cultivated male-exclusive cultures that served as substitutes for both religion and family life. He also co-edited Meanings for Manhood: Constructions of Masculinity in Victorian America (1990) with Clyde Griffen, an early work in the field of men's history.

In 1989, the American Council of Learned Societies selected Garraty and Carnes to develop the American National Biography as the successor to the Dictionary of American Biography. Published in 1999, the 24-volume reference work contained 17,400 entries totaling 20 million words. Commenting on the effort, The Times of London wrote "Not since putting a man on the Moon has an American organisation undertaken such an ambitious logistical project." Released in both print and online editions, the American National Biography won the R.R. Hawkins Award for Outstanding Scholarly Work from the Association of American Publishers (1999) and the Waldo G. Leland Prize from the American Historical Association (2001).

Carnes continued to explore the intersection of history and culture in later works. He published Novel History: Historians and Novelists Confront America's Past (and Each Other) in 2001, and in 2004 succeeded Oscar Handlin as series editor of the Library of American Biography. His work on Reacting to the Past eventually resulted in the publication of six books. In his book Minds on Fire: How Role-Immersion Games Transform College (2014), he argued that American higher education had long struggled to compete with the allure of student subcultures such as fraternities, athletics, drinking, and video games. He contended that intellectualized role-playing games like Reacting to the Past effectively harnessed those motivational energies.

== Selected publications ==
- The Compensations of War: The Diary of an Ambulance Driver during the Great War. 1983. ISBN 978-0292710740.
- Carnes, Mark Christopher (1989). Secret Ritual and Manhood in Victorian America. Yale University Press. ISBN 978-0300051469.
- Carnes, Mark C.; Griffen, Clyde (1990). Meanings for Manhood: Constructions of Masculinity in Victorian America. University of Chicago Press. ISBN 978-0226093659.
- Past Imperfect: History According to the Movies. 1995. ISBN 978-0805037593.
- Novel History: Historians and Novelists Confront America's Past (and Each Other). 2001. ISBN 978-0684857664.
- Carnes, Mark C. (2002). Invisible Giants: Fifty Americans Who Shaped the Nation but Missed the History Books. DIANE Publishing Company. ISBN 978-1422356159.
- The Columbia History of Post-World War II United States. 2007. ISBN 978-0231121262.
- Minds on Fire: How Role-Immersion Games Transform College. 2014. ISBN 978-0674984097.
- Carnes, Mark Christopher; Garraty, John Arthur (2016). The American Nation: A History of the United States. Pearson. ISBN 9780205958504.
- The Threshold of Democracy: Athens in 403 B.C. 2022. ISBN 978-1469670751.
- Rousseau, Burke and Revolution in France, 1791. 2022. ISBN 978-1469670744.
- The Trial of Galileo: The "New Cosmology" Versus Aristotelianism and the Catholic Church. 2022. ISBN 978-1469670812.
