= Local Law Enforcement Block Grant =

Former United States federal block grant

Local Law Enforcement Block Grants (LLEBG) were federal assistance block grant programs provided by the United States Department of Justice to local governments, which would then use the funds to support public safety or crime prevention efforts. It was part of the Bureau of Justice Assistance office.

== Origin ==
The LLEBG program was enacted by the 104th Congress on April 26, 1996, after it was attached to the FY 2006 omnibus appropriations bill. Program funding was high initially, reaching $1.2 billion over the first three fiscal years of its existence, and supporting a wide variety of locally initiated programs.

== Expiration ==
Following the September 11, 2001 attacks, LLEBG funding was deprecated in favor of counter-terrorism programs such as those funded by the new Department of Homeland Security. Funding declined from $418 in 2001 to $115 million in 2004, and was replaced in 2006 by the Justice Assistance Grant.
