= Keith Coble =

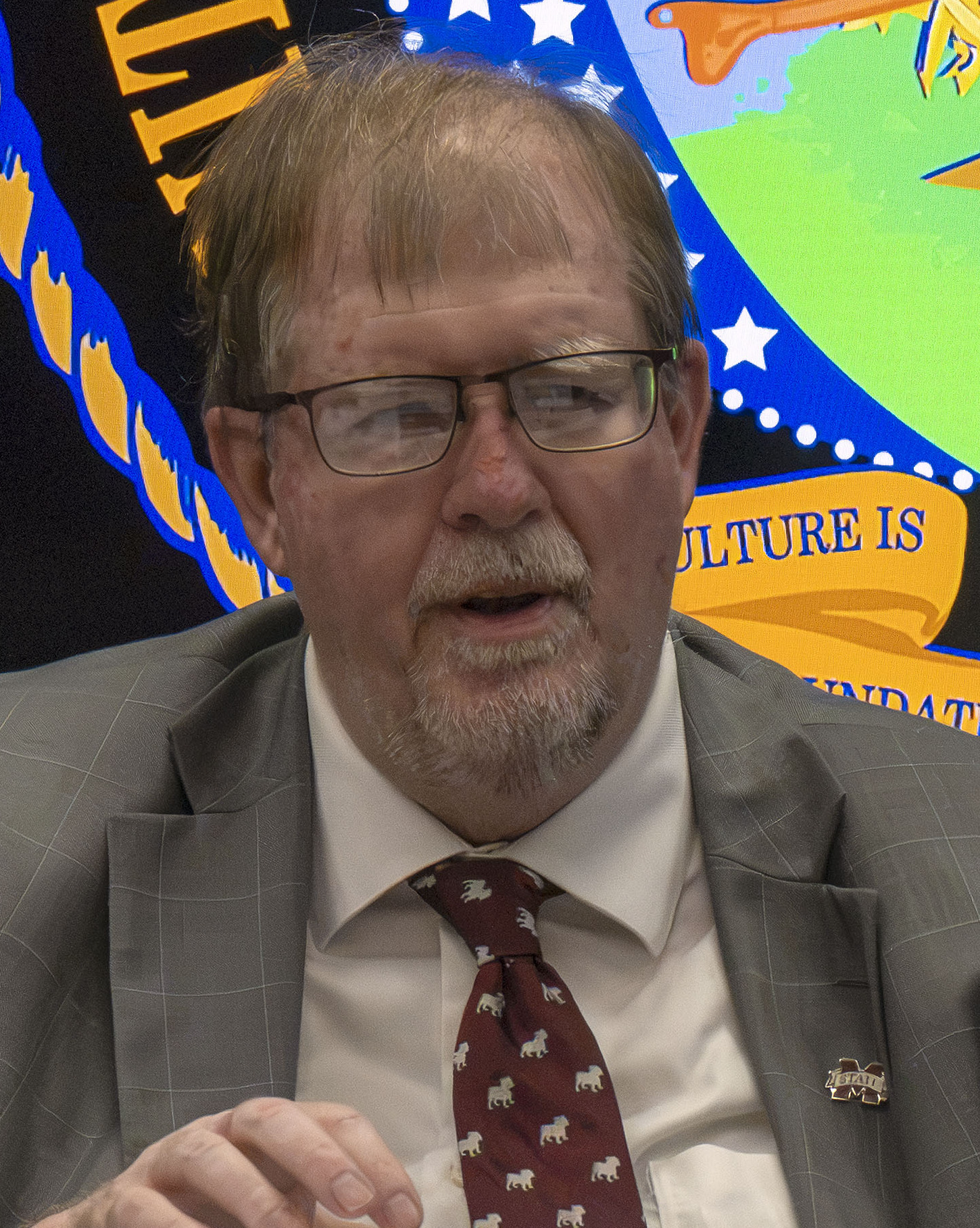
- Coble speaking in 2026
- Education: University of Missouri, Columbia (BS, MEd); Texas A&M University (PhD)
- Occupation: Economist

Keith H. Coble is an American agricultural economist focusing on risk management, food and agricultural policy, renewable energy, insurance, climate, and experimental economics. He is currently a W. L. Giles Distinguished Professor at Mississippi State University.
