= Child care management software =

Software for use by child care centers

Child care management software, also referred to as child care administrative software or daycare accounting software, is business software designed specifically for use by child care centers, preschools, and similar child-oriented facilities. They can be either run from local computers or via mobile/hand-held access to other systems running elsewhere. The software is intended to increase staff productivity by recording unique child and family information.

This category of software incorporates aspects of other types of business software, notably accounting software, but typically addresses business management issues that are unique to child care and beyond the scope of generic business software. Immunization tracking and record keeping for the Child and Adult Care Food Program (CACFP) are examples of the specific nature of such software that appeals to a niche market.

Child care management software is typically developed by an independent software vendor. Capabilities vary by vendor but may include tracking one or more of the following:

- Sign In-Out of Children and Staff
- Child scheduling and attendance
- Authorized pick up persons
- Child/teacher ratios
- Staff scheduling
- Classroom rosters and reporting
- Child immunizations
- Emergency contacts
- Photographs of children or pick up persons
- Waiting list management
- Summer camps, activities and after school programs
- Student meal counts
- Menu planning
- Automated billing for private pay and subsidized child care
- Family tax statements and receipts
- Electronic payment processing
- Payroll and time cards
- General accounting and financial reporting
