= Independent software vendor =

Company specializing in software sales

An independent software vendor (ISV), also known as a software publisher, is an organization specializing in making and selling software, in contrast to computer hardware, designed for mass or niche markets. This is in contrast to in-house software, which is developed by the organization that will use it, or custom software, which is designed or adapted for a single, specific third party. Although ISV-provided software is consumed by end users, it remains the property of the vendor.

Software products developed by ISVs serve a wide variety of purposes. Examples include software for real estate brokers, scheduling for healthcare personnel, barcode scanning, stock maintenance, gambling, retailing, energy exploration, vehicle fleet management, and child care management software.

An ISV makes and sells software products that run on one or more computer hardware or operating system platforms. Companies that make the platforms, such as Microsoft, AWS, Cisco, IBM, Hewlett-Packard, Red Hat, Google, Oracle, VMware, Lenovo, Apple, SAP, Salesforce and ServiceNow encourage and lend support to ISVs, often with special "business partner" programs. These programs enable the platform provider and the ISV to leverage joint strengths and convert them into incremental business opportunities.

Independent software vendors have become one of the primary groups in the IT industry, often serving as relays to disseminate new technologies and solutions.

Examples of ISV includes Microsoft, Red Hat, Canonical, Adobe, Oracle.

== See also ==
- Commercial off-the-shelf
- Micro ISV
