= Magnet school =

Public schools with specialized courses or curricula

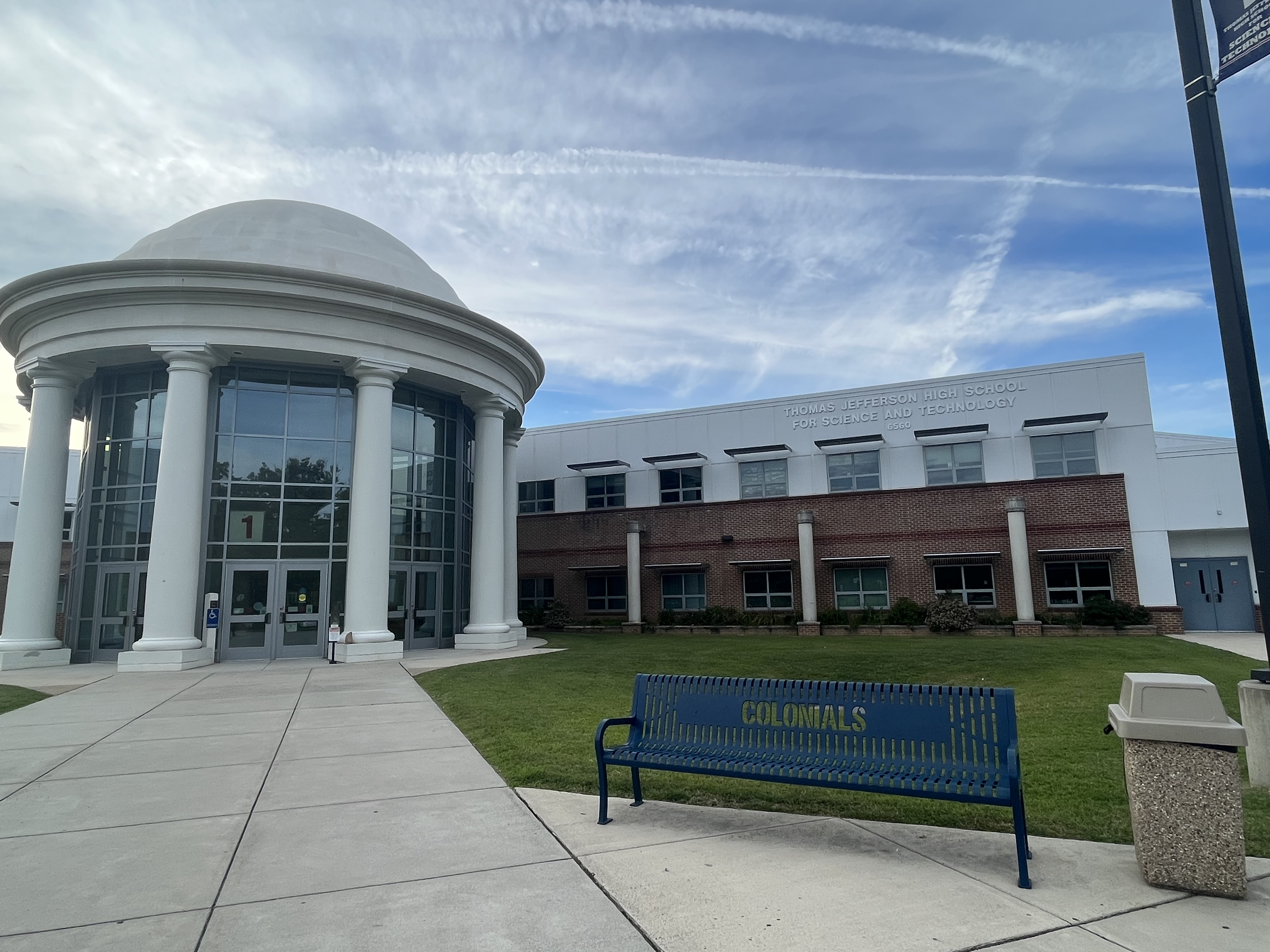
Thomas Jefferson High School for Science and Technology in Fairfax, Virginia, one of the highest rated magnet schools in the United States

In the U.S. education system, magnet schools are public schools with specialized courses or curricula. A student will attend an elementary school, which could determine the middle school and high school they will go to, however this isn't typically the case. "Magnet" refers to how magnet schools accept students from different areas, pulling students out of the normal progression of schools. Attending them is voluntary.

There are magnet schools at the elementary, middle, and high school levels. In the United States, where education is decentralized, some magnet schools are established by school districts and draw only from the district, while others are set up by state governments and may draw from multiple districts. Other magnet programs are within comprehensive schools, as is the case with several "schools within a school". In large urban areas, several magnet schools with different specializations may be combined into a single "center," such as Skyline High School in Dallas.

Other countries have similar types of schools, such as specialist schools in the United Kingdom. Most of these are academically selective. Other schools are built around elite sporting programs or teach agricultural skills such as farming or animal husbandry.

In 1965, then-Vice President Hubert Humphrey came to John Bartram High School in Southwest Philadelphia to declare it the first magnet school in the country. Bartram's curriculum was concentrated in the commercial field, offering commercial and business training to students from all over Philadelphia.

== History ==
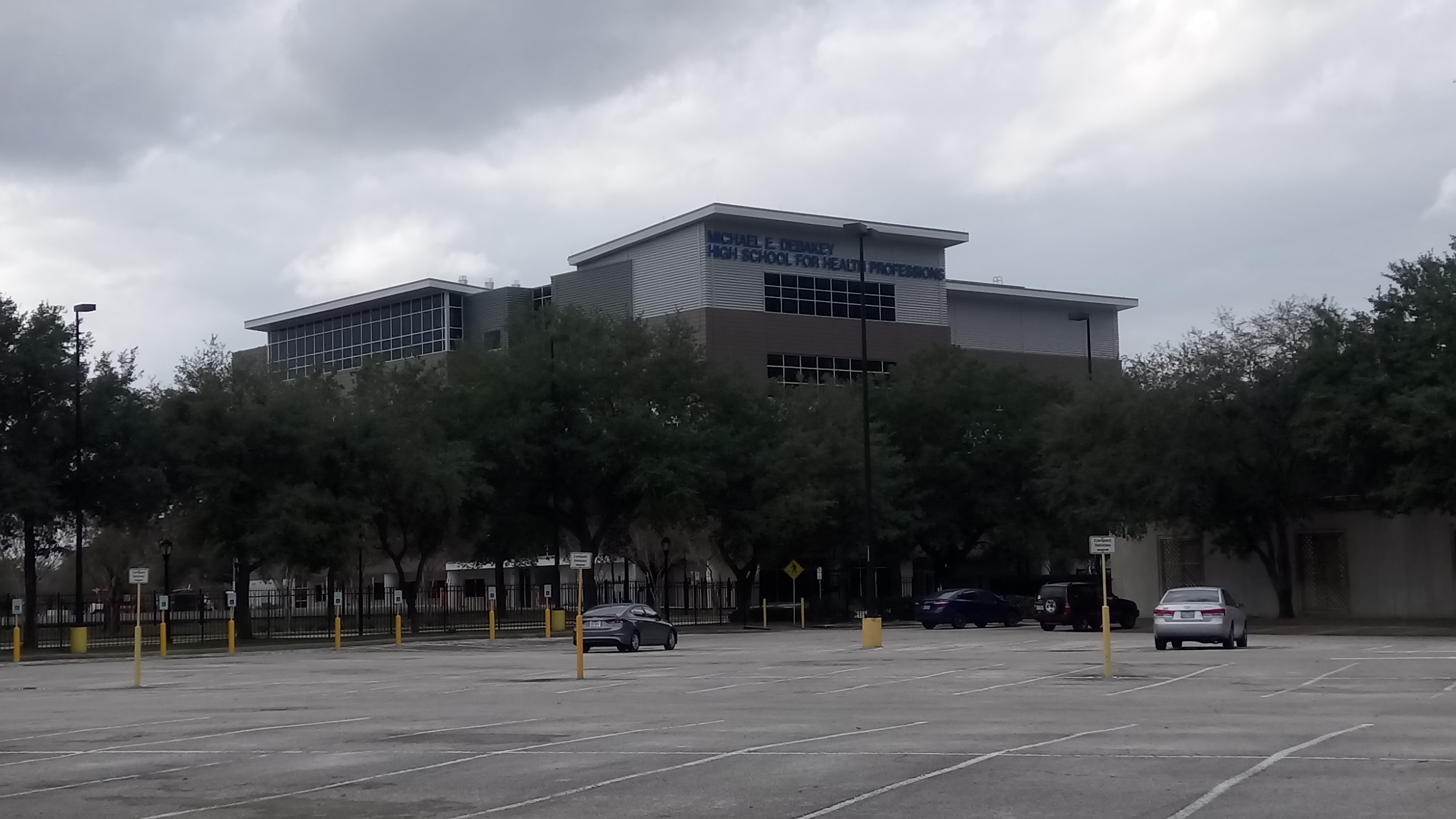
DeBakey High School for Health Professions in Houston, Texas, is a magnet school specializing in medical sciences

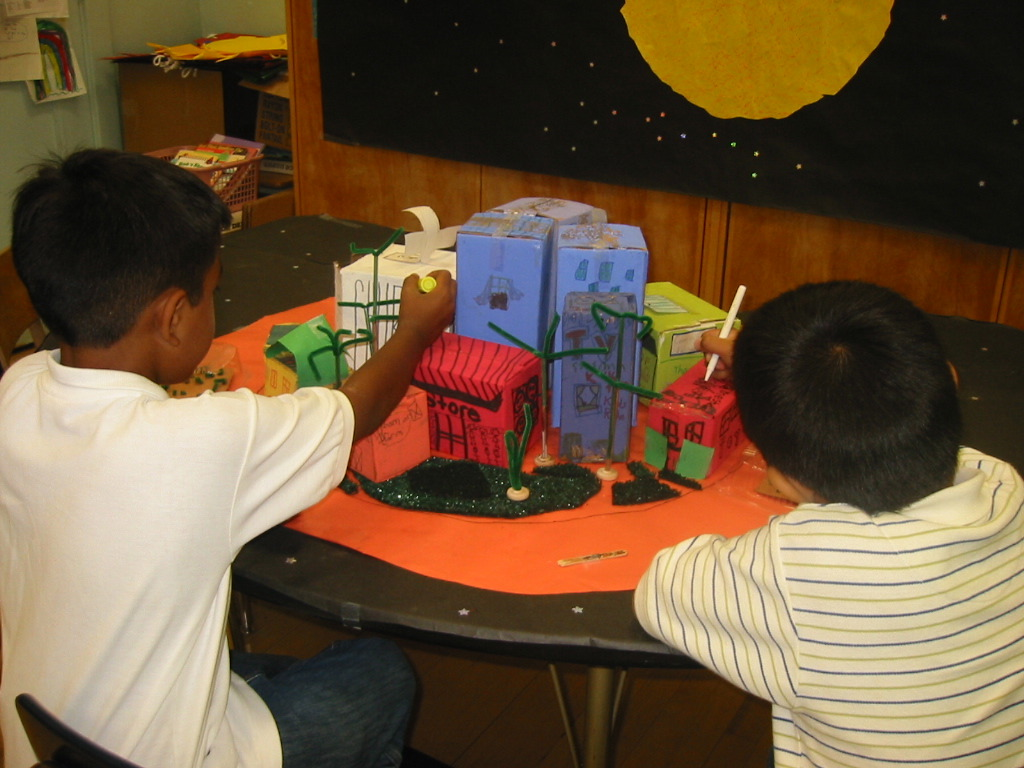
These 2nd graders from Buchanan Math Science Magnet School in Los Angeles, work on an art project. After studying the physical environment of the planet Mars, they are now designing a suitable Martian community.

In the United States, the term "magnet school" refers to public schools with enrichment programs that are designed to attract and serve certain targeted subgroups of potential students and their families. There are two major categories of public magnet school structures in the United States, and although there is some overlap, their origins and missions remain largely distinct.

The first type of magnet school is the fully competitive admissions magnet school. These schools use competitive admissions, usually rely on a standardized assessment score, and are structured to serve and support populations that are 100% gifted and/or talented students. Schools in this group generally rank among the top 100 public high schools in the United States. Examples of this type of school and program include the Maine School of Science and Mathematics, Thomas Jefferson High School for Science and Technology in Virginia, The School Without Walls in the District of Columbia, and nine schools that all use competitive admissions and are overseen by the New York City Department of Education (which still uses the older term "specialized school" instead of "magnet school" to refer to them). In addition, Chicago Public Schools uses the term "selective enrollment" instead of "magnet school".

Another type of "magnet school" or "magnet program" emerged in the United States in the 1970s as one means of remedying racial segregation in public schools, and they were written into law in Section 5301 of the Elementary and Secondary Education Authorization. Demographic trends following the 1954 Brown v. Board of Education US Supreme Court decision revealed a pattern later characterized as white flight, the hypersegregation of blacks and whites, as the latter moved to the suburbs. The first magnet school, McCarver Elementary School, opened in Tacoma, Washington, in 1968. This second type of magnet can often take the form of "a school within a school," meaning that the school may have no competitive admissions for the majority of the school population, and even the magnet program itself may not have fully competitive admissions. This is consistent with the equity-based objectives of such programs.

With the magnets designed to increase equity, at first school districts tried using involuntary plans which involved court-ordered attendance, the bussing of children far from their homes, and building closer schools to achieve the required balance. Later, voluntary school integration plans were developed. One approach that educators within the public school system came up with was open schools. During the Open Schools movement of the 1970s, several ideas designed to influence public education were put into practice, including Schools without Walls, Schools within a School, Multicultural Schools, Continuation Schools, Learning Centers, Fundamental Schools, and Magnet Schools. "These schools were characterized by parent, student, and teacher choice, autonomy in learning and pace, non-competitive evaluation, and a child centered approach." Magnet schools have been the most successful of the ideas that originated from the Open Schools movement. It was expounded in 1971 by educator Nolan Estes, superintendent of Dallas Independent School District. The Magnet Schools Assistance Program was developed in the early 1980s as a way to encourage schools to address de facto racial segregation. Funds were given to school districts that implemented voluntary desegregation plans or court orders to reduce racial isolation.

From 1985 to 1999, a US district court judge required the state of Missouri to fund the creation of magnet schools in the Kansas City Public Schools to reverse the white flight that had afflicted the school district since the 1960s. The district's annual budget more than tripled in the process. The expenditure per pupil and the student–teacher ratio were the best of any major school district in the nation. Many high schools were given college-level facilities. Still, test scores in the magnet schools did not rise; the black–white gap did not diminish; and there was less, not greater, integration. Finally, on September 20, 2011, The Missouri Board of Education voted unanimously to withdraw the district's educational accreditation status from January 1, 2012.

Districts started embracing the magnet school models in the hope that their geographically open admissions would end racial segregation in "good" schools and decrease de facto segregation of schools in poorer areas. To encourage the voluntary desegregation, districts started developing magnet schools to draw students to specialized schools all across their districts. Each magnet school would have a specialized curriculum that would draw students based on their interests. One of the goals of magnet schools is to eliminate, reduce, and prevent minority group isolation while providing the students with a stronger knowledge of academic subjects and vocational skills.

Within a few years, in locations such as Richmond, Virginia, additional magnet school programs for children with special talents were developed at facilities in locations that parents would have otherwise found undesirable. That effort to both attract voluntary enrollment and achieve the desired racial balance met with considerable success and helped improve the acceptance of farther distances, hardships with transportation for extracurricular activities, and the separation of siblings. Even as districts such as Richmond were released from desegregation court orders, the parental selection of magnet school programs has continued to create more racially diverse schools than would have otherwise been possible. With a wide range of magnet schools available, a suitable program could be found for more children than only the "bright" ones for whom the earliest efforts were directed.

Some 21st-century magnet schools have de-emphasized the racial integration aspects, such as Capital Prep Magnet School, a high school in Hartford, Connecticut. Capital Prep, a year-round school where more than 80% of its students are black and Latino, boasts a near-0% dropout rate; 100% of its 2009 senior class was sent to a four-year college. According to the school's principal, the goal is to prepare all of its students for college.

Since coming into fruition, the number of magnet schools has risen dramatically. Over 232 school districts housed magnet school programs in the early 1990s. By the end of the decade, nearly 1,400 magnet schools were operating across the country.

Traditionally, these magnet schools are found in neighborhoods with large minority populations. They advertise their unique educational curricula in order to attract white students who do not live in the surrounding area. In this way, the schools act as a "magnet" pulling out-of-neighborhood students that would otherwise go to a school in their traditional attendance zone.

== Enrollment and curriculum ==
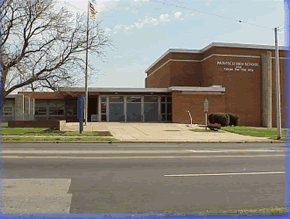
Patapsco High School and Center for the Arts in Baltimore specializes in performing and visual arts, including theatre and dance, and is also a Comprehensive high school.

Some magnet schools have a competitive entrance process, requiring an entrance examination, interview, or audition. Other magnet schools either select all students who apply, or use a lottery system among students who apply, while others combine elements of competitive entrance and a lottery among applicants.

Most magnet schools concentrate on a particular discipline or area of study, while others (such as International Baccalaureate schools) have a more general focus. Magnet programs may focus on academics (mathematics, natural sciences, and engineering; humanities; social sciences; fine or performing arts) or may focus on technical/vocational/agricultural education.

Access to free transportation is a key component in facilitating racial diversity in magnet schools. According to a survey distributed at the Magnet Schools of America's (MSA) 2008 annual meeting, in magnet schools with free transportation services, non-white students comprise almost 33% of the student body, which is higher than the 23% found in magnet schools without such services. Moreover, 11.9% of magnet schools that do not provide transportation are largely one-race, while only 6.4% of magnet schools with the provision of transportation are characterized as one-race schools. Such services are integral in ensuring that potential out-of-neighborhood students have access to these schools of choice. Ultimately, the presence of free transportation contributes to more integrated magnet environments.

Across the country, magnet school application forms assume that its readers are proficient in reading and writing in English, understand the school's curriculum, and recognize what kinds of resources are offered to students at that respective school. In diverse urban contexts especially, these assumptions privilege some families over others. Parents who seek out magnet schools tend to be Asian, educated, middle-class, and English-fluent. Thus, in order to break down the racial disparities these schools were intended to dismantle, magnet school programs have to be intentional in not only their outreach efforts, but also how they create the application text itself.

== Magnet Schools By State ==
Magnet Schools by U.S. State or Other Jurisdiction (School Year 2021–22)
State or other jurisdiction	Number of Public Schools	Number of Magnet Schools	Percent Magnet Schools
Alabama	1,507	36	2.39%
Alaska	500	32	6.40%
Arizona	2,418	†	
Arkansas	1,084	32	2.95%
California	10,327	†	
Colorado	1,941	26	1.34%
Connecticut	1,000	103	10.30%
Delaware	229	3	1.31%
Florida	4,191	616	14.70%
Georgia	2,314	14	0.61%
Hawaii	294	†	
Idaho	784	22	2.81%
Illinois	4,386	†	
Indiana	1,915	24	1.25%
Iowa	1,325	†	
Kansas	1,355	37	2.73%
Kentucky	1,535	64	4.17%
Louisiana	1,367	39	2.85%
Maine	598	2	0.33%
Maryland	1,417	151	10.66%
Massachusetts	1,847	0	0.00%
Michigan	3,538	335	9.47%
Minnesota	2,661	74	2.78%
Mississippi	1,040	13	1.25%
Missouri	2,453	29	1.18%
Montana	827	†	
Nebraska	1,083	†	
Nevada	746	50	6.70%
New Hampshire	494	0	0.00%
New Jersey	2,558	†	
New Mexico	890	†	
New York	4,802	219	4.56%
North Carolina	2,719	228	8.39%
North Dakota	513	†	
Ohio	3,659	†	
Oklahoma	1,792	†	
Oregon	1,285	†	
Pennsylvania	2,941	54	1.84%
Rhode Island	315	†	
South Carolina	1,267	123	9.71%
South Dakota	721	†	
Tennessee	1,906	120	6.30%
Texas	9,105	273	3.00%
Utah	1,106	22	1.99%
Vermont	305	2	0.66%
Virginia	2,129	202	9.49%
Washington	2,546	64	2.51%
West Virginia	694	0	0.00%
Wisconsin	2,243	6	0.27%
Wyoming	359	†	
District of Columbia	240	†	
Bureau of Indian Education	174	0	0.00%
American Samoa	29	†	
Guam	44	†	
Commonwealth of the Northern Mariana Islands	35	†	
Puerto Rico	851	26	3.06%
U.S. Virgin Islands	21	1	4.76%

† Information on magnet school status was not available or not applicable to the state or other jurisdiction.

== In other countries ==
- Specialized school in post-Soviet countries
- Specialist school in UK
- Selective school in Australia

== See also ==
- Alternative school
- Career and Technical Education
- Education reform
- Exceptional education
- Learning centers
- Public education
- School choice
- Selective school
- Specialized high schools in New York City
