= Child and Adult Care Food Program =

U.S. federal aid program

The Child and Adult Care Food Program (CACFP) is a type of United States federal assistance provided by the Food and Nutrition Service (FNS) of the United States Department of Agriculture (USDA) to states in order to provide a daily subsidized food service for an estimated 3.3 million children and 120,000 elderly or mentally or physically impaired adults in non-residential, day-care settings. It is a branch within the Policy and Program Development Division of the Child nutrition programs, along with the School Programs Branch, which runs the National School Lunch Program. The program is commonly referred to as the Child Care, Child Care Food, Adult Care, or Adult Care Food Program, and is often operating in conjunction with other child and adult day-care programs, such as the Head Start. Its federal identification number, or CFDA number, is 10.558. Section 17 of the National School Lunch Act, and USDA issues the program regulations under 7 CFR part 226.

== Program benefits ==
The program’s benefits consist of nutritious meals and snacks served to eligible children and adults who are enrolled for care at participating child care centers, adult day care centers, outside-school-hours care centers, after-school at-risk programs, family and group day care homes, and homeless and emergency shelters. These centers and shelters can be public and private non-profit centers, proprietary organizations, schools, private homes, and elderly centers, among others, on condition that they all comply with federal, state and local licensing and approval requirements. Through CACFP, children and older adults gain access to "nutritious foods that contribute to the wellness, healthy growth, and development of young children, and the health and wellness of older adults and chronically impaired disabled persons."

In 2023, a study published in the Journal of the Academy of Nutrition Dietetics noted that CACFP positively impacts the lives of children and families who receive subsidized meals in child care settings. Specifically, researchers found that children from low income families between 13 and 48 months old who received meals through this initiative were 39% less likely to be categorized as having poor or fair health and 41% less likely to be admitted to the hospital via emergency room. They were also 30% less likely to have overall household food insecurity compared to children from similar socioeconomic backgrounds who ate meals provided by their caretakers.

== Administration ==
The USDA's Food and Nutrition Service (FNS) administers the program through grants-in-aid to states. The program is administered within most states by its designated educational agency, such as New York’s Department of Health. In certain states, the program is administered by an alternate agency, such as the state department of health, family and/or social services. At the discretion of the state’s governor, different agencies may administer the program’s child-care and adult day-care components, such as Wildwood C.A.C.F.P in Colorado. In the state of Virginia, the program is directly administered by the Food and Nutrition Service Mid-Atlantic Regional Office (MARO).

Actual federal assistance provided to states and their designated agencies are in the form of cash reimbursement for meals served, and any other donation by the USDA to provide such meals. Program funds are provided to states through letters of credit issued under the FNS Agency Financial Management System. The states, in turn, use the funds to reimburse institutions for costs of actual operations (e.g., providing meals), as well as to support state administrative expenses. Generally, a state’s claim to cash reimbursement from the USDA is computed by first determining the number of meals served (by category and type), and multiplying the amount of service by a per-unit payment rate, also known as the “reimbursement rate.” The “type” of meal refers to the kind of meal service for which the institution seeks reimbursement, such as breakfasts, lunches, snacks, supplements, and dinners served. The “category” refers to the type of economic need of the child or adult to whom a meal is served, which can be categorized as “paid,” “reduced price,” or “free” meals.

Child-care, adult day-care, and outside-school-hours centers may charge a single fee to cover tuition, meals, and all other day care services to recoup certain costs; however, the vast majority of these centers operate non-pricing (free) programs. Nevertheless, all institutions must determine the eligibility of children and adults enrolled at these centers (e.g. low-income, mentally or physically disabled, etc.) for free or reduced price meals because such eligibility determinations affect the reimbursement rates for meals served to the participants. Homeless children residing at a participating homeless shelter are considered categorically eligible for meals served by that shelter. After-school at-risk programs, emergency shelters, and family day care homes are prohibited from charging separately for meals.

== See also ==
- Head Start Program
- Food Stamp Program
- WIC
- Child nutrition programs
- Institute of Child Nutrition
- Nutrition Assistance for Puerto Rico
- Federal assistance in the United States
- Social programs in the United States
- Child care management software
