= Federal grants in the United States =

United States federal government funding to state and local projects

Federal grants in the United States are a form of economic aid issued by the government out of the general federal revenue. A federal grant is an award of financial assistance from a federal agency to a recipient to carry out a public purpose of support or stimulation authorized by a law of the United States.

Grants are federal assistance to individuals, benefits or entitlements. A grant is not used to acquire property or services for the federal government's direct benefit.

Grants may also be issued by private non-profit organizations such as foundations, not-for-profit corporations or charitable trusts which are all collectively referred to as charities.

Outside the United States grants, subventions or subsidies are used to in similar fashion by government or private charities to subsidize programs and projects that fit within the funding criteria of the grant-giving entity or donor. Grants can be unrestricted, to be used by the recipient in any fashion within the perimeter of the recipient organization's activities or they may be restricted to a specific purpose by the benefactor.

== American definition ==
Federal grants are defined and governed by the Federal Grant and Cooperative Agreement Act of 1977, as incorporated in Title 31 Section 6304 of the U.S. Code. A Federal grant is a:

"...legal instrument reflecting the relationship between the United States Government and a State, a local government, or other entity when 1) the principal purpose of the relationship is to transfer a thing of value to the State or local government or other recipient to carry out a public purpose of support or stimulation authorized by a law of the United States instead of acquiring (by purchase, lease, or barter) property or services for the direct benefit or use of the United States Government; and 2) substantial involvement is not expected between the executive agency and the State, local government, or other recipient when carrying out the activity contemplated in the agreement."

When an awarding agency expects to be substantially involved in a project (beyond routine monitoring and technical assistance), the law requires use of a cooperative agreement instead. When the government is procuring goods or services for its own direct benefit, and not for a broader public purpose, the law requires use of a federal contract.

The preference for use of goods, products, and materials produced in, and services offered in, the United States which applies to federal procurement policy is also applied to the use of federal grants.

== Types of grants ==
- Categorical grants may be spent only for narrowly defined purposes and recipients often must match a portion of the federal funds. 33% of categorical grants are considered to be formula grants. About 90% of federal aid dollars are spent for categorical grants.
  - Project grants are grants given by the government to fund research projects, such as a research project for medical purposes. An individual must acquire certain qualifications before applying for such a grant and the normal duration for project grants is three years.
  - Formula grants provide funds as dictated by a law.
- Block grants are large grants provided from the federal government to state or local governments for use in a general purpose.
- Earmark grants are explicitly specified in appropriations of the U.S. Congress. They are not competitively awarded and have become highly controversial because of the heavy involvement of paid political lobbyists used in securing them. In FY1996 appropriations, the Congressional Research Service found 3,023 earmarks totaling $19.5 billion, while in FY2006 it found 12,852 earmarks totaling $64 billion.

For charitable grants and funds for schools and organizations see: Grant writing and Grants.

There are over 900 grant programs offered by the 26 federal grant-making agencies. These programs fall into 20 categories:

- Agriculture
- Arts
- Business and Commerce
- Community Development
- Consumer Protection
- Disaster Prevention and Relief
- Education Regional Development
- Employment, Labor, and Training
- Energy
- Environmental Quality
- Food and Nutrition
- Health
- Housing
- Humanities
- Information and Statistics
- Law, Justice, and Legal Services
- Natural Resources
- Science and Technology
- Social Services and Income Security
- Transportation

== Information provided in grant applications ==
Award information in grants generally includes:

- Estimated funding
- Expected number of awards
- Anticipated award size
- Period of performance

Eligibility information includes:

- Eligible applicants
- Cost sharing

== Criticism ==
Federal and state grants frequently receive criticism due to what are perceived to be excessive regulations and not include opportunities for small business, as well as for often giving more money per person to smaller states regardless of population or need. These criticisms include problems of overlap, duplication, excessive categorization, insufficient information, varying requirements, arbitrary federal decision-making, and grantsmanship (a funding bias toward entities most familiar with how to exploit the system, rather than to those most in need). Research also suggests that federal grants are often allocated politically, with more money going to areas represented by members of Congress holding seats on key congressional committees and the political party commanding a majority in Congress or that controls the presidency.

== Examples of grants by type ==
=== Block ===
- Community Development Block Grant
- Alcohol, Drug Abuse, and Mental Health Services Block Grant (ADMS)
  - Substance Abuse Prevention and Treatment Block Grant (SABG or SAPT)
  - Community Mental Health Services Block Grant (MHBG or CMHS)
- Local Law Enforcement Block Grant
- National Institutes of Health for bioscience research
- National Science Foundation for physical science research

=== Formulary ===
- Aid to Families with Dependent Children
- Job Training Partnership Act

=== Categorical ===
- Head Start Program
- Magnet Schools Assistance Program

== See also ==
- Grant writing
- Federally Funded Research and Development Center (FFRDC)
- Funding Opportunity Announcement
- Small Business Administration
- National Grants Management Association (NGMA)
