= Grant writing =

Applying for a financial grant

Grant writing is the practice of completing an application process for a financial grant, which are often provided by governments, corporations, foundations, and trusts. The skill of grant writing is known as grantsmanship.

Grants are often written for charitable causes, research, and artistic projects.

The grant writing process involves not only creating a coherent proposal but also analysing the needs of the grant maker. Such an analysis is necessary, as the grant maker and recipient may not have completely similar interests, and the writer should position the proposal to highlight aspects that fulfil the funder's needs. Grantsmanship analysis may involve conducting research on the organisation and corresponding with relevant staff.

Although grant writing has traditionally been carried out by the person or organisation seeking to carry out the grant's objectives if funded, third-party grant writers may also be employed. A growing number of professional and academic courses have developed on grant writing.

== Process ==
Open grants are often posted online through a request for proposals.

After a grant has been selected, the elements of proposal creation typically involve:

- Analyzing the intended audience for the proposal
- Analyzing the purpose of the proposal
- Gathering information about the subject of the proposal
- Writing the proposal
- Formatting the proposal
- Revising, editing, and proofreading the proposal
- Submitting the proposal

These elements are less discrete stages than they are overlapping and often recursive activities. The individual sections of a grant proposal include:

1. Summary or abstract
2. Introduction or narrative
  1. Mission statement
  2. Significance
3. Analysis
  1. Literature review
  2. Data collection or projection
4. Workplan
  1. Methodology
  2. Evaluation
  3. Communications
5. Budget
6. Experience
7. Appendices

The post award phase is the last part of the lifecycle of a grant. After funding is awarded, the funder may require the award recipient to make changes for continued support or as part of the grant contract.

=== Analysis ===
Some major agencies list recent grant recipients and titles of proposals online. In the United States, a grant writer may request copies from the funding agency using the Freedom of Information Act.

=== Drafting ===
Some grant writers work in a team with other professionals.

=== Education and community engagement ===
Grant writing is taught in college and university writing programs. Some grant writing courses use service projects in which students write grants for university or community organizations. These courses give students experience researching community needs, analyzing data, and writing for funding agencies with specific requirements.

Grant writing can also connect organizations seeking funding with organizations that provide it. However, access to grant funding can be difficult for smaller grassroots organizations that may have limited staff, resources, or experience with complex funding requirements. University partnerships and grant writing courses can provide organizations with additional research and writing support.
