= Magnet Schools Assistance Program =

US Federal educational grants program

Magnet Schools Assistance is a Federal grants program administered by the U.S. Department of Education. The program is designed to help desegregate public schools. The program is defined in the Elementary and Secondary Education Act of 1965, in Section 5301, though the program itself was developed in the early 1980s to address de facto racism through funds given to school distracts that were voluntarily implementing desegregation plans or court orders intended to reduce racial isolation.

== Purpose of the Program ==
The Magnet Schools Assistance Program serves many purposes including but not limited to:

- Actively eliminating, reducing, and preventing the isolation of minority groups within the public education system as has historically occurred in the past through assisting in the effort to voluntary desegregate public elementary and secondary schools.
- Developing and implementing the projects of magnet schools that will assisting local education agencies (LEAs) to achieve systemic reforms and allow them the resources to provide students with opportunities to succeed academically.
- Designing a range of innovative educational practices and developing educational methods that promote diversity, increase choices, and offer more opportunities within public elementary schools, public secondary schools, and public educational programs.
- Offering courses of instruction within program-funded magnet schools that are intended to substantially strengthen knowledge and ensure the attainment of relevant skills to succeed in vocational, technological, and professional pools for students attending such schools.
- Improving the capacity at which LEAs continue to function after federal funding for the magnet school is terminated through professional development.
- Ensuring that all students enrolled and attending magnet school programs have equal access to high quality education that will assist them in achieving academic success both during and after their time in elementary and secondary education programs if postsecondary education or productive employment is desired for continuation.

== Types of projects ==
Magnet schools offer a wide range of distinctive education programs. Enrolling in these schools is often a highly competitive experience. Applicants are required to develop hypothetical magnet school projects in order to demonstrate how they intend to align a magnet school project with their already existing desegregation plans. They must also provide according context and a summary of their intended goals in line with their desegregation plan as well as lay out how the funding provided by the program will assist in achieving district goals related to the purposes of the program.

Projects are meant to support the development and design of education methods and practices that will promote diversity and increase choices in the public education system. MSAP supports capacity development—the ability of a school to assist all of its students in meeting more challenging standards in their education—through the encouragement of professional development along with other activities that will continue to enrich the educational experience of students in magnet schools at a high performance level even after funding ends.

MSAP funded magnet schools are notably characterized by the fact that they are still public schools despite the enhancements made to the institutions through program funding. These elementary schools, secondary schools, and education centers offer special curriculums that are capable of bringing in a significant number of students that come from a plethora of different backgrounds. These schools offer a variety of distinctive education programs, some based specifically on community interests and others that emphasize specific academic subjects such as math, science, technology, language immersion, visual and performing arts, or humanities.

- Magnet schools
