= Alcohol, Drug Abuse, and Mental Health Services Block Grant =

Former U.S. federal aid program

The Substance Abuse Prevention and Treatment Block Grant (SABG or SAPT) and the Community Mental Health Services Block Grant (MHBG or CMHS) are federal assistance block grants awarded by SAMHSA.

== History ==
The Alcohol, Drug Abuse, and Mental Health Services Block Grant (ADMS block grant) was created in August 1981 with passage the Omnibus Budget Reconciliation Act of 1981. It replaced four earlier grant programs legislated by the Community Mental Health Centers Act, Mental Health Systems Act, Comprehensive Alcohol Abuse and Alcoholism Prevention, Treatment and Rehabilitation Act and Drug Abuse Prevention and Treatment Act. Whereas those grants had been administered by the National Institute on Alcohol Abuse and Alcoholism, National Institute on Drug Abuse, and National Institute of Mental Health, the ADMS grants were administered by the Alcohol, Drug Abuse, and Mental Health Administration. The 21st Century Cures Act (§§ 8001 et seq.) replaced ADMS with the Substance Abuse Prevention and Treatment Block Grant (42 U.S.C. § 300x-21 et seq) and the Community Mental Health Services Block Grant (42 U.S.C. § 300x et seq).

== See also ==
- Social programs in the United States
- Administration of federal assistance in the United States
