= Micro ISV =

Independent Software Vendor with fewer than 10 developers

A micro ISV (abbr. mISV or μISV), a term coined by Eric Sink, is an independent software vendor with fewer than 10 or even just one software developer. In such an environment the company owner develops software, manages sales and does public relations.

The term has come to include more than just a "one-man shop," but any ISV with more than 10 employees is generally not considered a micro ISV. Small venture capital-funded software shops are also generally not considered micro ISVs.

Micro ISVs sell their software through a number of marketing models. The shareware marketing model (where potential customers can try the software before they buy it), along with the freeware marketing model, have become the dominant methods of marketing packaged software with even the largest ISVs offering their enterprise solutions as trials via free download, e.g. Oracle's Oracle database.

== Microsoft and other micro ISV outreach efforts ==
Microsoft has a dedicated MicroISV/Shareware Evangelist, Michael Lehman. Part of the Microsoft micro ISV technical evangelism program includes Project Glidepath, which is a kind of framework to assist micro ISVs in bringing a product from concept through development and on to market.

Although not specifically targeted at micro ISVs, the Microsoft Empower Program for ISVs is used by many micro ISVs. Microsoft Empower Program members are required to release at least one software title for the Windows family of operating systems within 18 months of joining the program. The Microsoft Action Pack Subscription is similar to the Empower Program in some ways.

Alternatively, rapid application development PaaS platforms like Wolf Frameworks have partner programs specifically targeted towards Micro ISVs enabling them with software, hardware and even free development services.

== Industry shows ==
The Software Industry Conference is an annual event in the United States attended by many micro ISVs. The European Software Conference is also attended by many micro ISVs and is held in various locations throughout Europe. ISDEF (Independent Software Developer Forum) also hosts an industry event in Russia with many micro ISVs attending.

== See also ==
- Software engineering
- Software development process
