= Entitlement program =

Benefits program

An entitlement is a government program guaranteeing access to some benefit by members of a specific group and based on established rights or by legislation. A "right" is itself an entitlement associated with a moral or social principle, while an "entitlement" is a provision made in accordance with a legal framework of a society.

In law, an entitlement is a provision made in accordance with a legal framework of a society. Typically, entitlements are based on concepts of principle ("rights") which are themselves based in concepts of social equality or enfranchisement. It is the content of a subjective right, namely the claim of a legal subject as against other persons to a legal object.

== United States government programs ==
In the United States, an entitlement program is a type of "government program that provides individuals with personal financial benefits (or sometimes special government-provided goods or services) to which an indefinite (but usually rather large) number of potential beneficiaries have a legal right ... whenever they meet eligibility conditions that are specified by the standing law that authorizes the program." Entitlement spending is distinct from discretionary spending. The United States Congress does not pass an annual appropriation; instead, expenditure on the program automatically increases or decreases with the number of claims against eligibility criteria. The government must provide the benefits even if it is insolvent, has reached the debt ceiling, or has not passed a budget.

Entitlement programs with dedicated funding sources, such as the payroll tax for Social Security, maintain a "trust fund." If the trust fund is exhausted, this means benefits must be paid from discretionary sources such as Income Tax revenue; it does not mean benefits will run out (although it implies other programs will need to be significantly curtailed given the size of entitlement programs relative to discretionary spending). In order to reduce the government's overall debt and interest expense, trust funds make inter-fund loans to the discretionary fund; otherwise, the government would simultaneously retain uninvested cash in reserves and borrow more at higher rates. Congress can, however, alter the standing law authorizing an entitlement program to increase solvency at any time by raising the tax rate on dedicated funding, decreasing eligibility, decreasing/restructuring benefits or imposing new taxes and fees. Courts tend to expand entitlement eligibility over time through broader definitions of eligibility, contributing to a tendency of scope creep and insolvency in entitlement programs. Trust funds also operate distinctly from discretionary funds in that they are allowed to accumulate surpluses over time. Discretionary funds are not allowed to accumulate retained earnings unless a specific rainy day fund is authorized. In discretionary spending, this is seen as a check on overtaxation.

The beneficiaries of entitlement programs are normally individual citizens or residents, although sometimes organizations such as business corporations, local governments, or even political parties may have similar special 'entitlements' under certain programs. Examples of entitlement programs at the federal level in the United States include Social Security, Medicare, most Veterans' Administration programs, federal employee and military retirement plans, and unemployment compensation programs. Many programs that seem like entitlements are in fact not entitlements. Federal Pell Grants receive an annual appropriation. If all the grants are awarded, the government may not make any grants until congress makes a new appropriation. In practice, the government makes the grants anyway, and Congress makes an appropriation in the following year to make up for the shortfall. Other non-entitlement programs accumulate waiting lists when appropriations run out.

Originally, the term "entitlement" in the United States was used to identify federal programs that, like Social Security and Medicare, got the name because workers became "entitled" to their benefits by paying into the system. Into the 21st century, the meaning has been used to refer also to benefits, like those of the food stamps program, which people become eligible to receive without paying into a system. Some federal programs are also considered entitlements even though the subscriber's "paying into the system" occurs via a means other than monetary, as in the case of those programs providing for veterans' benefits, and where the individual becomes eligible via service in the U.S. military.

== See also ==
- Entitlement (fair division)
- Entitlement theory
- Negative and positive rights
