= Nutrition Program for the Elderly =

The Nutrition Program for the Elderly (NPE), authorized under Title III of the Older Americans Act (P.L. 89-73, as amended), provides (1) basic grants to operate nutrition programs for the elderly, such as meals-on-wheels and congregate dining programs, and (2) additional cash payments or commodity assistance for each meal served. The basic grants are funded under annual appropriations to the Department of Health and Human Services and distributed by formula. The additional per-meal cash or commodity assistance is funded under annual appropriations to the Food and Nutrition Service (FNS). While states may opt for either cash or commodity assistance, most choose per-meal cash payments.
