= Administration of federal assistance in the United States =

How the US government distributes federal aid

In the United States, federal assistance, also known as federal aid, federal benefits, or federal funds, is defined as any federal program, project, service, or activity provided by the federal government that directly assists domestic governments, organizations, or individuals in the areas of education, health, public safety, public welfare, and public works, among others.

The assistance, which can reach to over $400 billion annually, is provided and administered by federal government agencies, such as the U.S. Department of Housing and Urban Development and the U.S. Department of Health and Human Services, through special programs to recipients.

While the ostensible goal of federal assistance programs is to provide healthcare or improve schools, members of Congress often treat them as opportunities to procure more funding for their constituents. As a result, people living in places that are represented by powerful members of Congress often receive more funding. Thus, the distribution of federal assistance often reflects the power dynamics on Capitol Hill rather than the needs of the country as a whole.

== Definition ==
The term assistance (or benefits) is defined by the federal government as:

The transfer of money, property, services, or anything of value, the principal purpose of which is to accomplish a public purpose of support or stimulation authorized by Federal statute,…and includes, but is not limited to, grants, loans, loan guarantees, scholarships, mortgage loans, insurance…, property, technical assistance, counseling, statistical, and other expert information; and service activities of regulatory agencies.

== Federal assistance programs ==
To provide federal assistance in an organized manner, the federal government offers assistance through federal agencies. It is the agency's responsibility to adequately provide assistance, as well as manage, account, and monitor the responsible use of federal funds used for that assistance. The agencies then supply the assistance to beneficiaries (known as recipients, see below), such as States, hospitals, non profit organizations, academic institutions, museums, first responders, poverty-stricken families, etc., through hundreds of individual programs. These programs are defined by the federal government as: "any function of a Federal agency that provides assistance or benefits for: (1) a State or States, territorial possession, county, city, other political subdivision, grouping, or instrumentality thereof; (2) any domestic profit or nonprofit corporation or institution; or (3) an individual; other than an agency of the Federal government".

Therefore, programs (or "functions") can refer to any number of activities or services provided by agencies, such as building a bridge, providing food or medicine vouchers to the poor, or providing counseling to violence victims. Programs are assigned to offices within a federal agency and may include administrative personnel who work directly or indirectly with the program.

Each program is created with a specific purpose and has unique operations and activities, (i.e., no program is made for the same purpose and to operate the same way as a previously existing program) and it is assigned an official name to differentiate it from other programs. A program may be called by a different term than its official name by the general public, by an entity, or even by law or regulation—such as by the type of activity or service it engages, by a specific project name (e.g., the Big Dig tunnel project), or any other similar term. This type of name, title or term given to a program is called the "popular name". However, the official name of program is standardized within the federal government so that federal agencies can maintain better accountability of their assigned assistance.

For example, an individual who receives rent assistance payments through the Section 8 Housing Choice Voucher program might not know the exact official name of the program, and may simply call it the "rent subsidizing" program, due to its type of activity or service. However, there are many other federal rent subsidizing programs, which require standard program names to differentiate them. In this case, programs such as Supportive Housing for the Elderly (Sec. 202), which is a project-based rental assistance program exclusively for the elderly and Section 8 Housing Assistance Payments Program-Special Allocations, a rent assistance program usually tied to public housing projects, also engage in the activity of rent subsidizing.

=== Examples of federal assistance programs ===
- Airport Improvement Program
- Alcohol, Drug Abuse, and Mental Health Services Block Grant
- Child and Adult Care Food Program
- Clean Water State Revolving Fund
- Community Development Block Grant
- Conservation Reserve Program
- Federal Pell Grant
- Supplemental Nutrition Assistance Program
- Head Start
- Local Law Enforcement Block Grant
- National Highway System
- Nutrition Assistance for Puerto Rico
- Private landowner assistance program (PLAP)
- Section 8 Housing Choice Voucher
- Social Security (Old-Age, Survivors, and Disability Insurance or OASDI)
- Temporary Assistance for Needy Families

=== Federal grants and awards ===
Programs administer assistance by "granting" or "awarding" a portion of the assistance to recipients. These are called Federal grants or awards. Recipients must first apply for the award directly to the federal agency that administers the program. The agency must then determine the amount of assistance to be awarded and notifies the recipient of the award. To be official, an award requires a contract or grant agreements between the agency and the recipient that details the use of the award and restrictions and limitations.

Federal awards may specify a time period during which the recipient may use the assistance. This is called the Period of Availability of Federal Funds. Most grants have a term of one year (although some may have a longer lifespan, even indefinitely), and the recipient must use the assistance within that timeframe. This is done because federal assistance is tied to the federal government's budget process, and any funds not used by a recipient within the specified time limit reverts to other uses.

As a condition of receiving Federal awards or grants, recipients must agree to comply with the applicable laws and regulations related to the program and its agency, as well as any provisions included in the contracts and grant agreements entered between the recipient and the agency. Failure to do so may lead to sanctions, including fines and penalties, exclusion or suspension from participating in federal assistance programs and activities, and/or criminal charges. Most federal program regulations for which agencies and recipients must always comply are compiled in the Code of Federal Regulations, with summaries and guidance for these regulations contained in OMB Circular letters.

=== Types of federal grants ===
Given the enormous size of federal assistance provided, the Federal government has designed different types of grants, each with its own unique way of awarding and/or operating:

- Project grants, sometimes referred to as discretionary grants, are awarded competitively. Project grants are the most common form of grants and a large number are found in scientific research, technology development, education (such as Federal Pell Grants), social services, the arts and health care types of assistance.
- Formula grants provide funds as dictated by a law. Examples of this type of grant includes Aid to Families with Dependent Children and the Job Training Partnership Act, and the Work Incentive Program. These can be sub-categorized as either Categorical or Block:
  - Categorical grants may be spent only for narrowly defined purposes and recipients often must match a portion of the federal funds.
  - Block grants combine categorical grants into a single program. Examples of this type of grant includes the Community Development Block Grant and the Alcohol, Drug Abuse, and Mental Health Services Block Grant. Recipients of block grants have more leeway in using funds than recipients of individual categorical grants.
- Earmark grants are explicitly specified in appropriations of the U.S. Congress. They are not competitively awarded, and have become controversial because of the involvement of political lobbyists used in the process of awarding them to recipients. In fiscal year 1996 appropriations, the Congressional Research Service found 3,023 earmarks totalling $19.5 billion, while in FY2006 it found 12,852 earmarks totalling $64 billion.

== Recipients ==
A recipient of federal awards or funds is defined as any non-federal entity that receives federal assistance and is part of, or located within, the United States and its territories and possessions. Recipients are grouped into six main categories, as established by the GSA:

- State governments - This category includes any of the 50 States of the United States and the District of Columbia (Washington, D.C.), or any agency or instrumentality of these governments, with the exception of institutions of higher education (colleges and universities) and hospitals.
- Local governments - This category includes any county, parish, municipality, city, town, township, village, State-designated Indian tribal government, local public authority, school district, special district, intrastate district, council of governments, sponsor group representative organizations, and other regional or interstate government entity, or any agency or instrumentality of a local government, which are located within the U.S.
- Territories and possessions - This category includes the Commonwealths of Puerto Rico and the Northern Mariana Islands, the Virgin Islands, Guam, Trust Territory of the Pacific Islands, and American Samoa.
- Indian Tribal governments - This category includes the governing body or a governmental agency of any Indian tribe, band, nation, or other organized group or community (including any Native village) within the U.S. and its territories. These must first be certified by the U.S. Secretary of the Interior as eligible to receive assistance under special programs and services provided through the Bureau of Indian Affairs and the Indian Health Service.
- Non-profit organizations and institutions – This category includes semi-public, public, and private institutions of higher education and hospitals, Native American Indian Organizations, and any other semi-public and private nonprofit organizations. However, Federally funded research and development centers (FFRDC) are excluded from this category.
- Private individuals – This category includes Native Americans, homeowners, students, farmers, artists, scientists, consumers, small businesses, refugees, aliens, veterans, senior citizens, low-income persons, health and education professionals, builders, contractors, developers, handicapped persons, and the physically afflicted. Examples of direct assistance to these individuals include Section 8 vouchers, Pell Grant scholarships, and disaster relief awards, among many others.

Every program is designed with a specific recipient in mind. Certain programs have restrictions on who may receive the assistance because of the nature of its activity or service. Examples include infrastructure programs and grants, which are usually restricted to States, local governments, and U.S. territories—because these are usually the only entities that administer public roads, bridges, etc. Another example is health-related research grants, which individuals are eligible for as long as they satisfy certain criteria, such as that they have a professional or scientific degree, three years of research experience, and are a citizen of the United States.

=== Pass-through entities and sub-recipients ===
The federal government allows certain entities mentioned above to act as a Pass-through entity that provides the federal assistance to another recipient. The Pass-through entity is still considered a recipient, but the assistance assigned to it may be "passed on" or "passed-through it" to another recipient. The entity that receives the assistance from a pass-through entity is a sub-recipient. This is allowed because certain federal programs may not have the organizational structure to provide assistance directly to the final recipient and requires support from other entities.

For example, crime-prevention federal programs may be assigned to a State Attorney General's Office (AGO) (considered a State government). This State office may decide to assign part of its federal grant through sub-grants (also known as sub-awards) to cities and counties within the State (considered local governments) for crime-prevention activities such as neighborhood watch programs or supplying new equipment to police forces. The original recipient, the AGO, has become a pass-through entity and the cities and counties have become "sub-recipients", all the while the assistance is still serving the federal program's purpose to prevent crime.

Sub-recipients may in turn pass on the assistance to another sub-recipient to serve the purpose required by the federal program, for example if the cities mentioned above pass on part of their assistance to nonprofit organizations dedicated to patrolling neighborhoods at night. Therefore, a recipient may be considered a pass-through entity and a sub-recipient at the same time.

Certain programs may require the original recipient to pass on the assistance to sub-recipients (i.e., the federal program requires that the assistance be provided to nonprofit neighborhood watch organizations, and the assistance passes recipient through sub-recipient until it reaches them), while others may require that the recipient not pass on the assistance (i.e., State must use the assistance entirely on its own). Some programs award assistance to a pass-through entity who is neither the direct applicant nor the ultimate beneficiary, such as the Pell Grant program where students apply and receive the aid but it is the university's responsibility to receive and administer the applications and disburse the aid.

Pass-through entities and sub-recipients are equally responsible for the management of federal aid received. The federal government monitors the federal aid provided to any recipient and requires all pass-through entities to monitor the aid they pass on. Noncompliance of a federal regulation on the part of the sub-recipient may also be attributed to the pass-through entity because it is still responsible for the funds it passed on.

== Catalog of Federal Domestic Assistance (CFDA) ==
The Catalog of Federal Domestic Assistance (CFDA) logo

The task of organizing and categorizing federal assistance programs into a uniform and standardized system has been assigned to the U.S. General Services Administration (GSA) since 1984. There were precursor catalogs to this one, focusing on particular topics and maintained by other groups, such as the US office of education. The GSA achieves these tasks by maintaining the Federal assistance information database, which incorporates all federal agency programs that provide grants and awards to recipients. The Office of Management and Budget (OMB) assists the GSA in maintaining the database by serving as an intermediary agent between the Federal agencies and GSA.

In addition to these tasks, the Federal Program Information Act requires the GSA to provide federal assistance information to the general public through the Catalog of Federal Domestic Assistance (CFDA), a free register, which incorporates both federal agency and federal program information. This register acts as both a directory and a dictionary, facilitating both recipients and the general public in finding information of a specific program.

Currently, programs in the Catalog are being classified by the GSA into 15 types of assistance, which are then sub-classified into seven financial types of assistance and eight non-financial types of assistance:

=== Financial type assistance ===
- Formula Grants (A) – Includes allocations of money to States or their subdivisions in accordance with distribution formulas prescribed by law or administrative regulation, for activities of a continuing nature not confined to a specific project. Examples of this type of assistance include transportation and infrastructure grants designated by Congress, such as the Community Development Block Grant (CDBG).
- Project Grants (B) – Includes funding of specific projects for fixed or known periods. Project grants can include fellowships, scholarships, research grants, training grants, traineeships, experimental and demonstration grants, evaluation grants, planning grants, technical assistance grants, survey grants, and construction grants.
- Direct Payments for Specified Use (C) – Includes financial assistance from the Federal government provided directly to individuals, private firms, and other private institutions to encourage or subsidize a particular activity by conditioning the receipt of the assistance on a particular performance by the recipient. One example of this type of assistance is the Section 8 Housing Choice Voucher program.
- Direct Payments with Unrestricted Use (D) – Includes financial assistance from the Federal government provided directly to beneficiaries who satisfy Federal eligibility requirements with no restrictions being imposed on the recipient as to how the money is spent. Included are payments under retirement, pension, and compensatory programs.
- Direct Loans (E) – Includes financial assistance provided through the lending of Federal monies for a specific period of time, with a reasonable expectation of repayment, of which may or may not require the payment of interest.
- Guaranteed/Insured Loans (F) – Includes programs in which the Federal government makes an arrangement to indemnify a lender against part or all of any defaults by those responsible for repayment of loans.
- Insurance (G)– Includes financial assistance provided to assure reimbursement for losses sustained under specified conditions. Coverage may be provided directly by the Federal government or through private companies, and may or may not involve the payment of premiums.

=== Non-financial type assistance ===
- Sale, Exchange, or Donation of Property and Goods (H) – Includes programs that provide for the sale, exchange, or donation of Federal real property, personal property, commodities, and other goods including land, buildings, equipment, food and drugs.
- Use of Property, Facilities, and Equipment (I) – Includes programs that provide for the loan of, use of, or access to Federal facilities or property wherein the federally owned facilities or property do not remain in the possession of the recipient of the assistance.
- Provision of Specialized Services (J) – Includes programs that provide Federal personnel directly to perform certain tasks for the benefit of communities or individuals. These services may be performed in conjunction with non-federal personnel, but they involve more than consultation, advice, or counseling. Examples include the legal representation provided by the "Protection of Voting Rights" and the 'Civil Rights of Institutionalized Persons" programs.
- Advisory Services and Counseling (K) – Includes programs that provide Federal specialists to consult, advise, or counsel communities or individuals to include conferences, workshops, or personal contacts.
- Dissemination of Technical Information (L) – Includes programs that provide for the publication and distribution of information or data of a specialized or technical nature frequently through clearinghouses or libraries.
- Training (M)– Includes programs that provide instructional activities conducted directly by a Federal agency for individuals not employed by the Federal government.
- Investigation of Complaints (N) – Includes federal administrative agency activities that are initiated in response to requests to examine or investigate violations of Federal statutes, policies, or procedures.
- Federal Employment (O) – Includes programs that reflect the Government-wide responsibilities of the Office of Personnel Management in the recruitment and hiring of Federal civilian agency personnel.

=== CFDA number ===
To help potential recipients locate a federal program, the General Services Administration assigns a two-digit number unique to each federal agency authorized to provide assistance, and a three digit number to each federal assistance program within that agency. With these designations, a federal assistance program is identified by the combination of both numbers, which in turn creates a five digit number divided by a dot (55.555). The two digit numbers assigned to federal agencies are:

- 10 – United States Department of Agriculture (USDA)
- 11 – United States Department of Commerce (DOC)
- 12 – United States Department of Defense (DoD)
- 14 – United States Department of Housing and Urban Development (HUD)
- 15 – United States Department of the Interior (DOI)
- 16 – United States Department of Justice (DOJ)
- 17 – United States Department of Labor (DOL)
- 19 – United States Department of State (DOS)
- 20 – United States Department of Transportation (DOT)
- 21 – United States Department of the Treasury (TREAS)
- 45 – National Endowment for the Humanities (NEH)
- 66 – United States Environmental Protection Agency (EPA)
- 81 – United States Department of Energy (DOE)
- 84 – United States Department of Education (ED)
- 93 – United States Department of Health and Human Services (HHS)
- 94 – Corporation for National and Community Service (CNCS)
- 96 – Social Security Administration (SSA)
- 97 – United States Department of Homeland Security (DHS)
- 98 – United States Agency for International Development (USAID)

== Monitoring activities ==
Due to the extensive amount of assistance the federal government provides, federal agencies rely on numerous monitoring activities performed by themselves, pass-through entities, and external sources. The most common monitoring procedure is the Single Audit. This is an annual examination of a recipient's operations and records that determines whether or not the recipient complied with laws and regulations applicable to the assistance they received. Additionally, Federal agencies routinely visit recipients and inspect their records and statements to check for situations of noncompliance with laws and regulations, and require periodic financial and performance reports that detail recipient operations. Federal agencies also require pass-through entities to perform similar procedures to their sub-recipients, since they are responsible for the assistance they pass on.
