= Public budgeting =

Academic subfield of public administration

Public budgeting is a field of public administration and a discipline in the academic study of public administration. Budgeting is characterized by its approaches, functions, formation, and type.

Authors Robert W. Smith and Thomas D. Lynch describe public budgeting through four perspectives: incrementalism, comprehensive planning, decision-making, and managerial. The politician sees the budget process as "a political event conducted in the political arena for political advantage". The economist views budgeting as a matter of allocating resources in terms of opportunity cost where allocating resources to one consumer takes resources away from another consumer. The role of the economist, therefore, is to provide decision makers with the best possible information. The accountant's perspective focuses on the accountability value in budgeting which analyzes the amount budgeted to the actual expenditures thereby describing the "wisdom of the original policy". Smith and Lynch's public manager's perspective on a budget is a policy tool to describe the implementation of public policy. Further, they develop an operational definition:

A "budget" is a plan for the accomplishment of programs related to objectives and goals within a definite time period, including an estimate of resources required, together with an estimate of resources available, usually compared with one or more past periods and showing future requirements.

Public budgeting refers to the process of allocating and managing public funds, typically by a government or other public organization. It involves setting priorities, estimating revenue, determining spending levels, and monitoring the use of funds.

== Differences between public and private budgeting ==
Resource Management:

Resource management is an important aspect of public budgeting, as it involves the allocation, utilization, and monitoring of financial, human, and other resources. Some key considerations in resource management of public budgeting include: prioritisation, efficiency, accountability, transparency, flexibility. Public budgets are of a greater size, however, the responsibility for them is assigned to relatively small number of executive representatives. Authors Robert D. Lee. Jr. et al. argue that governments do not use all available resources, even though this has been violated in the United States during times of major crises such as World War II. On the other hand, they suggests that during times unaffected by the crisis most of the Gross domestic product is managed by the private sector. Governments have almost unlimited power to decide how much money will be used for public purposes, whereas private sector is reliable on their ability to sell their product on the market.

Profit Motive:

Private sector motivation is driven by maximisation of profit. It is a form of evaluating success of the private subject. The success of government cannot be measured in terms of profit because most of the activities managed by the government are unprofitable. Although, there are some government activities that yield profit which cannot be always measured in terms of money, even though we realize there is an existing benefit to such programs. Authors Robert D. Lee. Jr. et al. provide an example of cancer research. It obviously yields great returns which cannot be directly measured in terms of money, although future earnings can be estimated according to the value of life. That is why more abstract terms of measuring results of governmental activities are preferable.

== Role of public budgeting ==
Public budgeting aims to allocate and manage government resources in a manner that maximizes their effectiveness and efficiency to attain public objectives and advance the welfare of the community. Furthermore, it also fosters accountability, transparency, and public participation in the budget process to ensure that government decisions align with public priorities and expectations.

=== Public Goods ===
Authors Robert D. Lee. Jr. et al. say that:

"Some government services yield public or collective benefits that are of value to society as a whole"

They suggest that this is the main difference from corporate products that are mostly consumed by an individual. Public goods have two main properties that indicate them.

- Nonexcludability: no one can be prevented from using them (for an example public lighting)
- Nonrivalness: consumption of the public good from one person does not affect other person's use (everyone consumes national defence in the same way and one person's consumption of national defence does not diminish its availability to others).

Public goods are also referred to as goods that cannot be provided by the market efficiently or will not be provided by the market at all. This idea was originally presented by economist Paul Samuelson in his seminal paper, "The Pure Theory of Public Expenditure," published in 1954.

==== Externalities ====
It is an effect that affects people beyond those who are targets of a particular service. Externalities can be either positive or negative, depending on whether the effect is beneficial or harmful. Managing different externalities is also a domain where governments interfere.

- positive externalities - occur when the consumption or production of a good or service has a beneficial effect on others, without compensation. One of the most typical examples is education. Governments provide access to some level of education regardless of their wealth. Although this service is provided to a particular person the overall effect benefits the whole society. Other examples are healthcare, and research and development.
- negative externalities - occur when the consumption or production of a good or service imposes costs on others, without compensation. Examples of negative externalities include pollution, noise, and traffic congestion. Some companies may pollute the environment, while they are maximizing their profit. It is the role of the government to prevent or minimize the cost arising from such actions.

=== Other responsibilities ===
- Demographic changes - governments influence demographic factors through public programs by implementing policies and programs aimed at changing the population size, age structure, and geographic distribution of a country's population. For example, governments may provide incentives for families to have more children in order to increase the birth rate and promote population growth, or they may provide healthcare and education programs to improve the health and education levels of the population, which can lead to demographic changes over time.
- High-risk situations - governments are able to bear or regulate risks connected to activities that would not be manageable for the private sector due to their ability to raise funds through taxation or borrowing (such as space exploration).
- Technological change - governments can help facilitate technological change by providing infrastructure for new means of transport, such as highways or public transportation systems. They may also provide funding for research and development of new technologies, such as renewable energy or artificial intelligence, which can help to drive innovation and economic growth. Additionally, governments also regulate industries to prevent monopolies and other market instabilities.

=== Examples of public goods ===
- education
- national defence
- clean air and water
- infrastructure (roads, bridges, telecommunication, water supply, heat, electricity, public lighting)
- research and development
- healthcare
- judiciary
- pensions

== Public budget revenues ==
Governments use public budgeting to allocate and manage the government budget in order to achieve social and economic objectives. Governments are to redistribute money in a socially beneficial way. In order to do so they need to raise the money from people in the most efficient and equitable manner or incorporate some profitable activities. However, most of the revenues are accumulated from taxes and social insurances. Finding the balance between income and expenditures is the goal in public budgeting but the specific income sources and services provided are equally important topic in the discussion about public budgeting.

The main sources of federal income in the United States are individual income tax, social insurance taxes (payroll tax for Social Security and Medicare), and the corporate income tax. These revenue streams are used to fund a wide range of public services, including national defence, social welfare programs, and public infrastructure.

The aim of the government is to minimize the dead weight loss of taxation and tax evasion. To address these issues, governments can implement measures such as simplifying the tax code, reducing tax rates, and increasing tax enforcement efforts. However, some tax costs cannot be avoided completely.

== Public budget expenditures ==
Basically, there are three main types of spendings:

Discretionary spendings - spendings that undergo an approval process which aims to modify the properties of those expenditures and can be modified every year, these can be operations of federal departments or investments in infrastructure, etc. Discretionary spendings are consisting from the half out of national defence expenses in the USA.

Mandatory spending - government is obligated to pay them according to law and they cannot be changed.

Mandatory spendings became higher over time and are the greater part of public expenditures. Most of them are closely connected to healthcare.

Net interest - refers to the amount of money the government has to pay each year on interests on the national debt.

There has been a huge shift towards mandatory spendings as countries around the world adopted various fiscal rules to enforce sustainability and to make public budgets more predictable over time . On the other hand, this implies that governments have much less space to control the public budget. Fiscal rules can have positive or negative outcomes according to the responsibility of the government. For governments that consume rising shares of national income, these rules may prevent enormous debt of the country during their governance.

Allen Schick suggests that the developed countries have gone through three stages of public budgeting scenarios.

Balanced budget norm - governments focused on balanced budget, each year they targeted the revenue expenditure balance but did not differentiate between recession and years of economic growth, because most of the countries could not follow this norm (during times of war and economic stagnation these rules have been constantly violated), even though it served as a rigid argument for cutting expenses.

Dynamic fiscal management - after the World War II. these rules shifted towards targeting balanced budget in the time horizon of one economic cycle, in some countries this meant that spendings should not exceed the government revenue that would be accumulated at full employment, the aim was to have an approximately same real output as the potential output.

Fiscal targets - with the demand for balancing the economy rather than balancing the budget. Governments used debt with the aim to stimulate the economy, but after the oil shocks the governments could not balance out the budget by raising taxes and had to adapt much stronger cuts on expenditures. As balanced budgets are not possible during economic fluctuations, governments are now focusing on long-term prospects perceiving debts as a drag on the future economic growth.

== Leading definitions ==
- Practical: "A plan for financing an enterprise or government during a definite period, which is prepared and submitted by a responsible executive to a representative body (or other duly constituted agent) whose approval and authorization are necessary before the plan may be executed." ~Frederick A. Cleveland
- Theoretical: The leading question: "On what basis shall it be decided to allocate x dollars to activity A instead of activity B?" ~V. O. Key Jr.

== Leading theorists and contributions ==
- Frederick Cleveland: constructed a practical definition of budgeting.
- William F. Willoughby: describes the purpose of a budget document.
- V. O. Key, Jr.: sparked the normative question regarding how scarce resources ought to be distributed to unlimited demands.
- Verne B. Lewis: argued for a budgeting theory based on economic values; strongly contributing to the study of public finance.
- Richard A. Musgrave: the Father of Public Finance; identified the three roles of government in the economy: allocation of resources, distribution of goods and services, and economy stabilization.
- Aaron Wildavsky: His work emphasized the political nature of budgeting, and he is known for developing the concept of "budgetary incrementalism," which describes the tendency of governments to make small, incremental changes to their budgets over time. He suggested that budgetary decision making is largely political, rather than based on economic conditions.
- Allen Schick: He is known for his work on budgetary reforms and his contributions to the field of performance-based budgeting. He outlined the three functions of budgeting:
1. Strategic Planning; deciding on the goals and objectives of an organization.
2. Management Control; management's process of assuring effective and efficient accomplishment of goals and objectives laid out via strategic planning.
3. Operational Control; focused on proper execution of specific tasks that provide the most efficient and effective means of meeting the goals and objectives ordered by management control.
- Irene S. Rubin: His work focuses on the role of budgeting in policy-making and the challenges of managing public finances in an era of fiscal austerity. He facilitated the discussion of the dichotomy between theory and practice of public budgeting.
- Robert D. Behn: His work has emphasized the importance of setting clear goals and measuring performance in order to improve the efficiency and effectiveness of public budgeting.
- Eugene Bardach: He is known for his work on the use of "policy tools" in the budgeting process, and his emphasis on the importance of evidence-based decision-making.

== Approaches to budgeting ==
Examples of budgeting approaches include:

- Line Item Budgeting is arguably the simplest form of budgeting, this approach links the inputs of the system to the system. These budgets typically appear in the form of accounting documents that express minimal information regarding purpose or an explicit object within the system. The focus is on controlling spending rather than maximising efficiency.
- Program Budgeting takes a normative approach to budgeting in that decision making—allocating resources—is determined by the funding of one program instead of another based on what that program offers. The goal is to allocate resources based on the relative importance of each program to the overall mission of the organization. This approach quickly lends itself to the PPBS budgeting approach.
- PPBS Budgeting, or Program Planning Budgeting System, is the link between the line-item and program budgets and the more complex performance budget. As opposed to the more simple program budget, this decision making tool links the program under consideration to the ways and means of facilitating the program. This is meant to serve as a long-term planning tool so that decision makers are made aware of the future implications of their actions. These are typically most useful in capital projects. The planning portion of the approach seeks to link goals to objects or expected outcomes from specific outputs, which are then sorted into programs that convert inputs to outputs; finally, the budgeting of PPBS helps determine how to fund the program. A leader in the promotion of PPBS was Robert McNamara's use in the United States Government's Department of Defense in the 1960s.
- Performance Based Budgeting attempts to solve decision making problems based on a programs ability to convert inputs to outputs and/or use inputs to affect certain outcomes. Whatever performance may be judged by a certain program's ability to meet certain objectives that contribute to a more abstract goal as calculated by that program's ability to use resources (or inputs) efficiently—by linking inputs to outputs—and/or effectively—by linking inputs to outcomes. A decision making—or allocation of scarce resources—problem is solved by determining which project maximizes efficiency and efficacy. The goal is to maximize the overall impact of the organization's resources.
- Zero-based budgeting (ZBB) is a response to an incremental decision making process whereby the budget of a given fiscal year (FY) is largely decided upon by the existing budget of FY-1. In contrast to incrementalism, the allocation of scarce resources—funding—is determined from a zero-sum accounting method. In government, each function of a department's section proposes certain objectives that relate to some goal the section could achieve if allocated x dollars.
- Flexible Freeze is a budgeting approach that combines elements of incrementalism and ZBB and that pioneered by President George H. W. Bush as a means to cut government spending. Under this approach, certain programs would be affected by changes in population growth and inflation. This approach can help organizations maintain fiscal discipline while also allowing for some flexibility in response to changing circumstances.
- Program Assessment Rating Tool (P.A.R.T.) is an instrument developed by the United States Office of Management and Budget (OMB) to measure and assess the effectiveness of federal programs that review the program’s purpose and design, strategic planning, program management, and program results and accountability. The scores are rated from effective (ranging between 85 and 100 points), moderately affective (70-84 points), adequate (50-69 points), and ineffective (0-49 points).
- Priority Based Budgeting is a response to poor economic conditions. As opposed to incremental budgeting, where resource allocation is determined based on marginal shifts in costs, priority based budgeting fixes the amount of governmental resources and then allocates resources across the various programs. The programs receive their allocation based on their priority; priorities may include safe and secure communities, health, education, and community development among others. Outcome assessment then determines the efficacy of the programs. Although this approach is pro-democratic, critics suggest the administration of this process is extremely difficult.

== Functions of a budget document ==
A government's budget is a comprehensive financial plan that outlines its priorities and objectives for a given period. As a policy document, a government's budget is designed as a plan for implementing its policy. Traditionally, budgets served as a more rigid tool to implement policy in a retrospective setting. The functions associated with these values are listed under the Traditional Model and are control, management, and planning. The Modern Model, taking a less rigid approach, has replaced the control function with the monitoring function, the management function with the steering function, and the planning function with the strategic brokering function.

Monitoring: focuses on the assessing the outcomes and consequences of expenditures.

Steering: as a response to the traditional management function, the steering function serves as a guide for managing.
Strategic Brokering uses the budget document as a means of constantly looking for possible directions and reacting to the environment. It can help the government stay attuned to changes in the environment and adjust its policies and spending accordingly.

== Values in budgeting ==
Three values are generally discussed in the literature of public budgeting: accountability, efficiency, and efficacy.

Accountability focuses on the inputs going into the system or program in action and is best characterized by the line-item budgeting approach. It is best suited for the control and monitoring functions of a budget.

Efficiency focuses on the process of the system or program and its conversion of inputs (resources) into outputs (policy). Its focus on the process makes this value appropriate for performance budgets and most in-line with management and steering functions.

Efficacy focuses on outputs and outcomes, measuring the impact of policy. This value follows both the program budget and PPBS budget approaches and coincides with the planning and strategic brokering functions.

== Six steps of the budgetary process ==
Typically, the budget cycles occurs in four phases. The first phase requires policy planning and resource analysis and includes revenue estimation. This is usually performed by individuals or teams within the executive branch, such as the finance director, manager, etc. The second phase is referred to as policy formulation and includes the negotiation and planning of the budget formation. This is where the budget call is issued to outline the presentation form and recommend certain goals. During this phase, the organization reflects on the past and sets goals for the future, while reconciling the difference. The third phase is policy execution, which follows budget adoption is budget execution—the implementation and revision of budgeted policy. In this phase, the organization amends the budget as the fiscal year progresses. The fourth phase encompasses the entire budget process. This phase is auditing and evaluating the entire process and system to ensure that it is operating effectively. See the associated points below:

- Revenue Estimation: This step involves estimating the amount of revenue that the organization expects to generate in the upcoming period. This can be based on a variety of factors, such as economic trends, past performance, and industry data. The revenue estimation is typically performed by the finance director, clerk's office, budget director, manager, or a team.
- Budget Call: The budget call is an announcement issued by the governing body that outlines the presentation form of the budget and recommends certain goals to be achieved. Typically, the budget call sets a deadline for departments to submit their budget requests.
- Budget Formulation: In this step, the finance department reviews past performance, sets goals for the future, and reconciles any differences between revenue projections and expected expenses. The department then creates a draft budget, which is reviewed and revised as needed.
- Budget Hearings: These are meetings where the governing body, departments, sections, the executive, and the public can discuss changes in the budget. These meetings are an opportunity for stakeholders to provide feedback and offer suggestions for improvements.
- Budget Adoption: final approval by the legislative body. Once the budget is adopted, it becomes the official plan for the upcoming fiscal year.
- Budget Execution: The budget execution phase involves monitoring the budget throughout the fiscal year and making any necessary adjustments. This can include amending the budget to reflect changes in revenue or unexpected expenses. The finance department must ensure that the budget is being followed and that any deviations are addressed promptly.

Annual budgets can create year-end spending incentives in the budget execution phase when unused funds expire. In a theoretical principal-agent model, a 2024 study argues that allowing departments to carry forward part of unused funds can reduce wasteful year-end spending; under some conditions, the optimal rule rolls over only a fraction of unused funds while returning the remainder.

== Types of public budgets ==
There are several types of public budgets that governments may use to allocate resources and plan for future spending. The most common types are:

- Operating budgets are those documents that describe the expenditures and revenues during a given period for the functioning of an organization. It also includes appropriations for salaries, utilities and other expenses.
- Capital budgeting is the process of planning for future purchases above a certain cost threshold or extended life span. This budget is typically accompanied by a capital improvement plan that describes a timeline for acquisition and payment of debt. Thus, a capital budget is used to fund large, long-term investments in infrastructure, such as roads, bridges, and public buildings.
- Program budget is a budget that is structured around specific programs or services, such as education or public safety. It allows for more detailed tracking of spending and performance metrics for each program, enabling governments to make data-driven decisions about resource allocation.
- Performance budget is a budget that is based on achieving specific outcomes or objectives, rather than simply allocating resources. It emphasizes measuring and evaluating the effectiveness of government programs and services, and allocating resources to achieve the greatest impact.
- Zero-based budget is a budgeting approach that requires justifying every dollar spent, rather than basing the budget on the previous year's spending. This approach forces government entities to critically evaluate every expense and prioritize resources based on the highest impact and greatest need.

== See also ==
- Budget
- Budget process
- Budget theory
- Constitutional economics
- Political economy

== Sources ==
- Lee, Robert D.; Johnson, Ronald Wayne; Joyce, Philip G. (2013). Public Budgeting Systems. Jones & Bartlett Publishers. ISBN 978-1-4496-2790-4.
