= Budget theory =

Study of motivations behind decisions

Budget theory is the academic study of political and social motivations behind government and civil society budgeting. Classic theorists in Public Budgeting include Henry Adams, William F. Willoughby, V. O. Key, Jr., and, more recently, Aaron Wildavsky. Notable recent theorists include Frank R. Baumgartner, Bryan D. Jones, Richard Fenno, Allen Schick, Dennis Ippolito, Naomi Caiden, Irene Rubin, James D. Savage, Thomas Greitens, Gary Wamsley, and Usman W. Chohan. Budget theory was a central topic during the Progressive Era and was much discussed in municipal bureaus and other academic and quasi-academic facilities of that time such as the nascent Brookings Institution.

The executive budget in United States was a financial innovation designed to empower city mayors and city managers with the capacity to implement needed policy reforms in the Progressive Era. Since that time, the executive budget has become a tool by which the president of the United States has been able to substantively shape policy and draw power to the president from Congress, which was originally charged with "holding the purse" (and still is constitutionally, as there is no federal-legislative authority to change the constitution outside the amendment process or for congress to legislate away their authority). This has resulted in an ever increasing role and power base for what is now called the Office of Management and Budget.

== Budget, Civil society and Constitutional economics ==
Constitutional economics is a field of economics and constitutionalism which describes and analyzes the specific interrelationships between constitutional issues and functioning of the economy including budget process. The standards of constitutional economics when used during annual budget planning, as well as the latter's transparency to the society, are of the primary guiding importance to the implementation of the rule of law. Also, the availability of an effective court system, to be used by the civil society in situations of unfair government spending and executive impoundment of any previously authorized appropriations, becomes a key element for the success of any influential civil society.

The term “constitutional economics” was used by American economist – James M. Buchanan – as a name for a new academic sub-discipline that in 1986 brought him the Nobel Prize in Economic Sciences for his “development of the contractual and constitutional bases for the theory of economic and political decision-making.” Buchanan rejects “any organic conception of the state as superior in wisdom, to the individuals who are its members.” This philosophical position is, in fact, the very subject matter of constitutional economics. Buchanan believes that a constitution, intended for use by at least several generations of citizens, must be able to adjust itself for pragmatic economic decisions and to balance interests of the state and society against those of individuals and their constitutional rights to personal freedom and private happiness.

The Russian school of constitutional economics was created in the early 21st century with the idea that CE allows for a combined economic and constitutional analysis in the legislative, first of all, budget process, thus helping to overcome arbitrariness in the economic and financial decision-making and to open entrance to civil society into budget process. This model of CE is based on the understanding that it is necessary to narrow the gap between practical enforcement of the economic, social and political rights granted by the constitution and the annual (or mid-term) economic policy, budget legislation and administrative policies conducted by the government. In 2006, the Russian Academy of Sciences has officially recognized constitutional economics as a separate academic sub-discipline.

Constitutional economics studies such issues as the proper national wealth distribution including the government spending on the judiciary, which in many transitional and developing countries is completely controlled by the executive. The latter undermines the principle of powers' “checks and balances”, as it creates a critical financial dependence of the judiciary. It is important to distinguish between the two methods of corruption of the judiciary: the state (through budget planning and various privileges – being the most dangerous), and the private. The state corruption of the judiciary makes it almost impossible for any business to optimally facilitate the growth and development of national market economy.

== See also ==
- public budgeting
- budget deficit
- budget surplus
- budget crisis
- Canadian federal budget
- Comprehensive income
- Constitutional economics
- Corporate finance
- Crony capitalism
- Form 10-K
- Federal Accountability Act (Canada)
- Government Accountability Office
- Government Accountability Office investigations of the Department of Defense
- Government-owned corporation
- public administration
- public finance
- United States budget process
- Civil society
