= Community Development Block Grant =

U.S. federal aid program

The Community Development Block Grant (CDBG), one of the longest-running programs of the U.S. Department of Housing and Urban Development, funds local community development activities with the stated goal of providing affordable housing, anti-poverty programs, and infrastructure development. CDBG, like other block grant programs, differs from categorical grants, made for specific purposes, in that they are subject to less federal oversight and are largely used at the discretion of the state and local governments and their subgrantees.

== History ==
The CDBG program was enacted in 1974 by President Gerald Ford through the Housing and Community Development Act of 1974 and took effect in January 1975. Most directly, the law was a response to the Nixon administration's 1973 funding moratorium on many Department of Housing and Urban Development (HUD) programs.

President Ford emphasized the bill's potential for reducing inefficient bureaucracy, as the grant replaced seven previous programs that were "too fragmented to provide comprehensive solutions to complex local needs". He also noted its potential for improving government effectiveness by "replacing Federal judgments on local development with the judgments of the people who live and work there": placing more decision-making power on local funding choices in the hands of local governments who "are most familiar with local needs". The CDBG was presented as explicitly meant to "redistribute influence from the federal bureaucracies to local governments" - in Ford's words, to "return power from the banks of the Potomac to people in their own communities".

It had bipartisan support, reportedly because liberal legislators shared its goal of extinguishing poverty and "urban blight" and conservative legislators appreciated the control the program placed in the hands of private investors and the reduction it made in the role of the United States government. Decentralizing control over community development appealed to some Democrats because the central administration of previous programs meant benefits often did not reach the targeted low-income communities, while Republicans appreciated that the program was represented as meant to "limit the powers of the federal bureaucracy", a political and ideological presentation reflective of "growing public resentment of big government and big bureaucracy".

The law ultimately passed both houses with large bipartisan majorities.

Later Congressional changes created additional small CDBG set-asides that fund programs in minority-serving universities (Section 107), in US territories such as Guam, and for large-scale rehabilitation loans (Section 108).

== Allocation of funds ==
CDBG funds are allocated on a formula basis.

Upon reauthorizing CDBG in 1978, Congress instituted a dual formula to strengthen controls on how money was spent and to better serve communities with different types of problems. A city's proportion of the overall CDBG allocation is either the average of the area's fractions of the US's total population, total poverty and total amount of housing overcrowding, or the average of the area's fractions of the country's total growth lag, total poverty, and total age of housing. Formula A typically benefits rapidly growing cities with high poverty that lack affordable housing. Formula B tends to benefit cities with large shares of old housing and low growth, including many affluent suburbs.

HUD calculates both formulas for all entitlement grantees and awards the larger amount, but Congressional appropriation has ultimate determination on program funding. These formulas have become less well matched to community need over time, and improvements or revisions have been proposed by several analytical reports.

More than 1,100 local and state governments, called "entitlement communities", automatically qualify for the grant. Cities qualify if they have populations of at least 50,000 or are the principal city of a Metropolitan Area, as determined by the Office of Management and Budget. Counties qualify if they have populations of at least 200,000, excluding any entitlement cities, and are in a metropolitan area. They are required to submit allocation reports (showing to whom and where the money was spent) and quarterly reports to the United States Department of Housing and Urban Development. First, "not less than 70 percent of CDBG funds must be used for activities that benefit low- and moderate-income persons". Secondly, funds must be spent on eligible activities, which are broadly defined as including "community development activities directed toward neighborhood revitalization, economic development, and improved community facilities and services". Such activities may include "Acquisition of real property, Relocation and demolition, Rehabilitation of residential and non-residential structures, Construction of public facilities and improvements", and more. Third, governments must follow a plan of project selection that includes citizen participation, especially by citizens who live in "areas in which the grantee proposes to use CDBG funds".

There are a number of other distribution methods of CDBG funds besides entitlement communities. The 1978 re-authorization also required HUD to award 30% of all CDBG funds to states for grants to municipalities and counties that are not entitlement communities. This is often called the "Small Cities" program, because it includes many small cities and rural counties. Other programs include the CDBG Insular Area Program (for American Samoa, Guam, the Northern Mariana Islands, and the U.S. Virgin Islands), the CDBG Program Colonias Set-Aside, and the Neighborhood Stabilization Program.

Nominal levels of CDBG funding have remained fairly constant over time, but they have dramatically declined over the course of the program's existence in inflation-adjusted terms, as can be seen in the figure to the right.

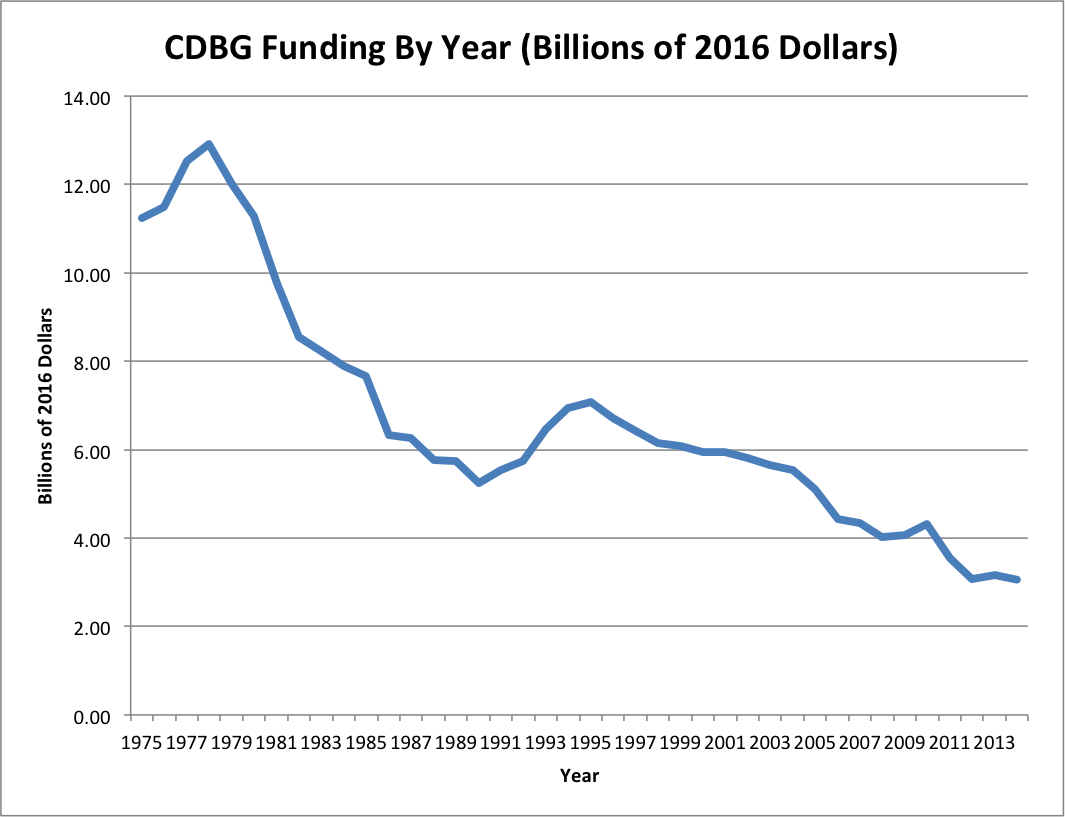
CDBG Allocation by Year from 1975-2014 in 2016 Dollars, taken from the U.S. Department of Housing and Urban Development, inflation adjustments from the Bureau of Labor Statistics

== Administration ==
Proposed CDBG projects must be consistent with broad national priorities for CDBG: activities that benefit low- and moderate-income people, the prevention or elimination of slums or blight, or other community development activities to address an urgent threat to health or safety. CDBG funds may be used for community development activities (such as real estate acquisition, relocation, demolition, rehabilitation of housing and commercial buildings), construction of public facilities and improvements (such as water, sewer, and other utilities, street paving, and sidewalks), construction and maintenance of neighborhood centers, and the conversion of school buildings, public services, and economic development and job creation/retention activities. CDBG funds can also be used for preservation and restoration of historic properties in low-income neighborhoods.

From the federal level, the Department of Housing and Urban Development has set three goals for Community Planning and Development (CPD) Programs – "To ensure decent housing; To create and maintain a suitable living environment; and To expand economic opportunities", that are taken directly from the Housing and Community Development Act. On the local level, however, each city is allowed to select their own objectives and priorities underneath each of those goals that they believe will best meet the needs of their community.

Local governments receiving CDBG funds must submit two annual performance and evaluation reports. First, an Annual Action Plan for the upcoming fiscal year that also serves as an application for funds is due to HUD in mid-May. This plan includes the area's expected funding resources and stated community development goals and provides information about planned projects including their geographic distribution and the activity categories and development objectives they fall under. The creation of the Action Plans includes community outreach, public meetings, and the solicitation of Requests for Proposals from city government departments and local nonprofits of activities that could be funded. Additionally, every five years the Annual Action Plan is submitted alongside a Consolidated Plan that outlines the area's long-term community development needs, priorities, and strategic plan. Second, a Consolidated Annual Performance Evaluation Report (CAPER) covering the previous fiscal year is submitted to HUD at the end of September to ensure the cities are meeting objectives. The CAPER includes "a description of the progress made in accomplishing the objectives" of the CDBG, and "a summary of the use of such funds during the preceding fiscal year".

Nationally, CDBG funds were spent for the following purposes in 2011:

- Public infrastructure (32.7%)
- Housing (24.8%)
- Administrative and planning (15.1%)
- Public services (11.4%)
- Economic development (7.3%)
- Property acquisition (4.9%)
- Other (3.8%)

In Fiscal Year 2017, the largest categories of CDBG spending were:

- Public infrastructure (36.0%)
- Housing (24.7%)
- Administrative and planning (14.2%)
- Public services (10.5%)
- Economic development (6.3%)
- Acquisition (4.9%)
- Other (4.0%)

== Relations with other programs ==
The CDBG shares some features of the Urban Development Action Grants (UDAG). UDAG, along with urban renewal and other previous federal attempts to alleviate poverty and blight in US cities, was criticized as being a "top-down" approach. For these programs, federal planners would dictate how and where funds were spent. In contrast, CDBG was constructed to be a "bottom-up" approach.

In order to receive CDBG funds, applicants must identify urgent needs of the community, and solicit project ideas and plans from citizens and local organizations that address those needs. Thus, the CDBG program represents a significant shift in how the federal government addresses poverty and blight.

Some researchers argue that because CDBG is a bottom-up program it is significantly more successful than previous programs. Others have said CDBG's scope of allowed activities is too broad, making it difficult to measure program performance.

== See also ==
- First time home buyer grant
