= Minority Business Development Agency =

US Department of Commerce division for marginalized ethnic groups

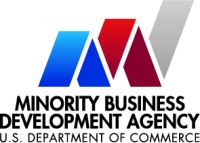
- Seal of the Minority Business Development Agency

Agency overview
- Formed: 1969; 57 years ago
- Headquarters: Washington, D.C.
- Employees: 50-100
- Annual budget: US$30 million (2009); US$32 million (est. 2010); US$32 million (est. 2011); US$34 million (est. 2017)
- Agency executive: Joyce Y. Meyer, Acting Under Secretary of Commerce for Minority Business Development
- Parent agency: U.S. Department of Commerce
- Website: www.mbda.gov

The Minority Business Development Agency (MBDA) is an agency in the United States Department of Commerce that promotes growth and competitiveness of the United States' minority-owned businesses, including Hispanic and Latino American, Asian Pacific American, African American, and Native American businesses.

MBDA's stated mission is to promote the growth and competitiveness of minority-owned businesses by providing access to capital, access to contracts and access to market opportunities – both domestic and global. The main feature of the organization and its site is to provide business consulting services to minority business owners.

In March 2025, President Trump issued an executive order that directed eliminating the MBDA to the maximum extent of the law.

== History ==
On March 5, 1969, President Richard Nixon issued Executive Order 11458, establishing the Office of Minority Business Enterprise. On October 13, 1971, President Nixon issued Executive Order 11625, which clarified MBDA's authority and expanded the scope of its operations. In 1979, the agency was renamed the Minority Business Development Agency.

The Reagan Administration established the Minority Business Development Center program, which became MBDA's primary method for delivering technical and management services to minority businesses. The George H.W. Bush Administration proposed eliminating the agency and transferring its mission to the Small Business Administration, but ultimately continued the agency as an entity within the Department of Commerce.

President Trump proposed eliminating all agency funding in his FY18 executive budget proposal. This reflected Heritage Foundation budget recommendations. His FY19 budget proposal recommended eliminating MBDA business centers but retaining the agency as a policy office.

On November 15, 2021, President Joe Biden signed the Infrastructure Investment and Jobs Act, which established the Minority Business Development Agency as a permanent agency. The law authorized $73 million in appropriations for MBDA for fiscal year (FY) 2021, $55 million for FY 2022, $70 million for FY 2023, and $68.25 million for FY 2024.

According to the MBDA, in FY 2023 it facilitated access to $1.5 billion of capital for minority-owned businesses and helped create or maintain 19,000 jobs.

In March 2024, a judge ruled that MBDA must provide support to all businesses and owners, regardless of race.

MBDA requested $80 million in appropriations for FY 2025 to continue to implement its responsibilities under the Minority Business Development Act of 2021. It stated it had 131 business centers and programs, including specialty centers that help business owners find financing, contracts, and markets for "Made in America" products.

In March 2025, President Trump issued an executive order that directed eliminating the MBDA "to the maximum extent consistent with applicable law", along with several other agencies.

== National Minority Enterprise Development Week ==
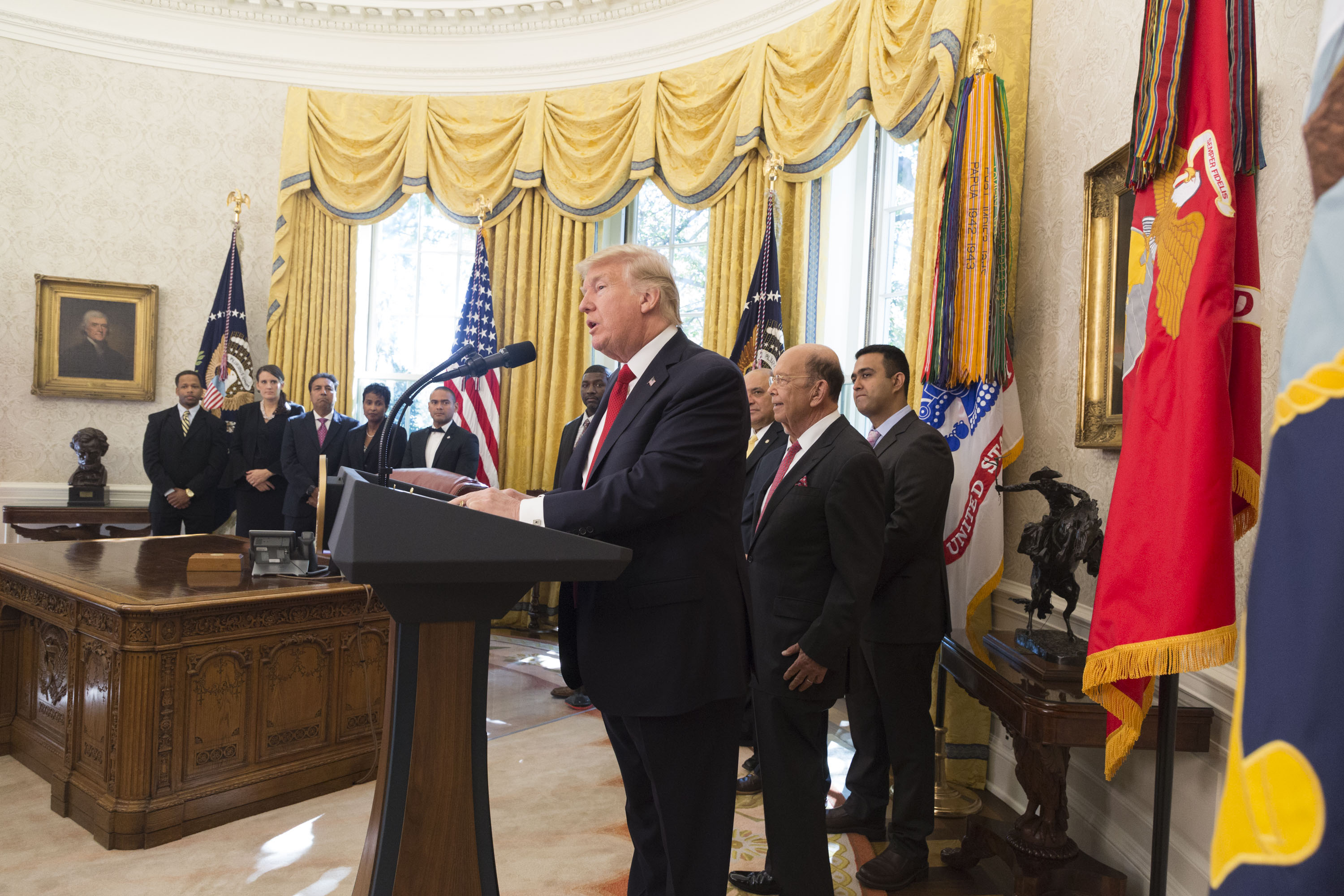
President Trump with 2017 National MED Week Award Winners in the Oval Office

The Agency holds National Minority Enterprise Development Week in the month of October, observed in the United States to recognize and celebrate the achievements and contributions of the minority business enterprise community.

President Ronald Reagan first recognized National MED Week in 1983. The week is formally celebrated each year by the Minority Business Development Agency, a U.S. government agency housed within the U.S. Department of Commerce.

On October 20, 2017, President Donald Trump issued a proclamation which officially designated October 22 through October 28, 2017 as National Minority Enterprise Development Week.

On October 24, 2017, President Trump recognized minority-owned businesses in the Oval Office during National MED Week, when he welcomed winners of the National MED Week Awards with Secretary of Commerce Wilbur Ross and MBDA Acting National Director Christopher A. Garcia.

== See also ==
- Title 15 of the Code of Federal Regulations
- Small Business Administration
- U.S. Department of Commerce
