= Civil Rights Act of 1960 =

United States law

- Long title: An Act to enforce constitutional rights, and for other purposes.
- Acronyms (colloquial): CRA
- Enacted by: the 86th United States Congress
- Effective: May 6, 1960

Citations
- Public law: 86-449
- Statutes at Large: 74 Stat. 86

Codification
- Acts amended: Civil Rights Act of 1957
- Titles amended: Title 18: Crimes and Criminal Procedure
- U.S.C. sections amended: 18 U.S.C. § 837; 18 U.S.C. § 1074; 18 U.S.C. § 1509

Legislative history
- Introduced in the House as H.R. 8601 by Emanuel Celler (D–NY) on March 10, 1960; Committee consideration by House Judiciary; Passed the House on March 24, 1960 (311–109); Passed the Senate on April 8, 1960 (71–18) with amendment; House agreed to Senate amendment on April 21, 1960 (288–95); Signed into law by President Dwight D. Eisenhower on May 6, 1960

Major amendments
- Civil Rights Act of 1964

The Civil Rights Act of 1960 (Pub. L. 86–449, 74 Stat. 89, enacted May 6, 1960) is a United States federal law that established federal inspection of local voter registration polls and introduced penalties for anyone who obstructed someone's attempt to register to vote. It dealt primarily with discriminatory laws and practices in the segregated South, by which African Americans and Tejanos had been effectively disenfranchised since the late 19th and start of the 20th century. This was the fifth Civil Rights Act to be enacted in United States history. (Note: After the Civil Rights Acts of 1866, 1871, 1875, and 1957) Over an 85-year period, it was preceded only by the Civil Rights Act of 1957, whose shortcomings largely influenced its creation. This law served to more effectively enforce what was set forth in the 1957 act through eliminating certain loopholes in it, and to establish additional provisions. Aside from addressing voting rights, the Civil Rights Act of 1960 also imposed criminal penalties for obstruction of court orders to limit resistance to the Supreme Court's school desegregation decisions, arranged for free education for military members' children, and banned the act of fleeing to avoid prosecution for property damage. The Civil Rights Act of 1960 was signed into law by President Dwight D. Eisenhower.

== Background ==
=== Reconstruction era ===
In American history, the Reconstruction era was the period from 1865 to 1877 following the end of the American Civil War. This period was marked by various attempts made to redress the inequities imposed on African Americans through slavery. As a result, the Thirteenth, Fourteenth, and Fifteenth Amendments of the United States Constitution were ratified. These amendments were established to provide African Americans the same civil rights as white Americans, and are collectively referred to as the Reconstruction Amendments. This time period marked the beginnings of the Civil Rights Movement.

=== Mid- and post-Reconstruction ===
By 1873, Supreme Court decisions began to limit the scope of Reconstruction legislation, and many whites resorted to intimidation and violence to undermine African Americans' voting rights. The Compromise of 1877, an informal agreement to resolve a political dispute, marked the end of the Reconstruction era. Southern Democrats largely stopped adhering to the provisions of Reconstruction legislation, ceasing to intervene in Southern voting practices, which prompted widespread disenfranchisement of African American voters. The Jim Crow Laws were established during the 19th century and served to block African American votes, ban integration in public facilities such as schools, and forbid interracial marriage in the South. The enactment of these laws severely undermined the progress toward equality made during the Reconstruction era.

=== Public opinion ===
During the 1950s, much of United States public opinion was still marked by a resistant attitude toward desegregation and racial equality, particularly in the South. Near the end of the decade, however, activists and proponents of the Civil Rights Movement had begun pressuring Congress to enact legislation which would more effectively protect the constitutional civil rights of African Americans.

=== Brown v. Board of Education ===
On May 17, 1954, the Supreme Court unanimously declared and established that racial segregation within schools was unconstitutional. This was the outcome of Brown v. Board of Education.

Subsequently, Southern white political leaders sought to defy the decision. Senator Harry Byrd of Virginia, the head of the Byrd Machine (Virginia's most influential political organization), described the decision as "the most serious blow that has yet been struck against the rights of the states in a matter vitally affecting their authority and welfare." Two years after the decision, Senator Byrd had gathered almost 100 Southern politicians' signatures for his Southern Manifesto, an agreement to resist the decision. On February 25, 1956, he proposed Massive Resistance, a set of laws enacted to block integration.

Aside from politicians, large groups of Southern white Americans also mobilized in efforts to prevent integration. Some white citizens elected to educate their children through private academies, which initially ran on public funds until this was found faulty in court. Some of these citizens also used threats of violence to intimidate black families.

=== Civil Rights Act of 1957 ===
By 1957, only about 20% of African Americans were registered to vote, largely due to the active disenfranchisement they had been facing. That year, President Eisenhower sent Congress a proposal for civil rights legislation. As a result, the Civil Rights Act of 1957 was enacted by the 85th Congress. This was the first federal civil rights law enacted since the Civil Rights Act of 1875, and was the first major piece of civil rights legislation passed by Congress. The Civil Rights Act of 1957 was also signed into law by President Dwight D. Eisenhower on September 9, 1957.

While aiming to enforce the voting rights of African Americans set out in the Fifteenth Amendment of the United States Constitution, the 1957 act had several loopholes that allowed civil rights resisters to continue preventing minorities from exercising their right to vote. Southern states continued to discriminate against African Americans in the application of voter registration and electoral laws, in the segregation of schools and public facilities, and in employment, despite the orders of the law. As the law had not resolved these issues, its outcomes highlighted a need for improved civil rights legislation, which was later fulfilled in part by the Civil Rights Act of 1960.

== Presidential involvement ==
=== President Dwight D. Eisenhower ===
Toward the end of his presidency, President Eisenhower publicly supported civil rights legislation. In his message to Congress on February 5, 1959, he called for further advancements within it, stating that "every individual regardless of his race, religion, or national origin is entitled to the equal protection of the laws." Within this message, he proposed a mandate including seven recommendations for the protection of civil rights, as listed below.

=== Eisenhower's mandate ===
- Strengthen the laws that would root out threats to obstruct court orders in school desegregation cases
- Provide more investigative authority to the Federal Bureau of Investigation in crimes involving the destruction of schools/churches
- Grant Attorney General power to investigate Federal election records
- Provide a temporary program for aid to agencies to assist with changes necessary for school desegregation decisions
- Authorize provision of education for children of the armed forces
- Consider establishing a statutory Commission on Equal Job Opportunity Under Government Contracts (later mandated in the Civil Rights Act of 1964 to create the Equal Employment Opportunity Commission)
- Extend the Civil Rights Commission an additional two years

=== State of the Union Address ===
In the annual presidential State of the Union speech on January 7, 1960, Eisenhower spoke out on the necessity of advancing civil rights legislation, citing constitutionality as justification. He noted that some citizens were still deprived of their right to vote despite constitutional guarantees, and that protecting this right should be a top priority. With reference to the recommendations he made to Congress, he stated, "I trust that Congress will thus signal to the world that our Government is striving for equality under law for all our people."

=== Statement upon signing ===
President Eisenhower also issued a statement upon signing the Civil Rights Act of 1960, stating that he felt the law would serve as a "historic step forward in the field of civil rights." Also within this statement, he emphasized the importance of certain provisions put forth by the law. He also discussed his predictions of what favorable outcomes would occur in result of these provisions:

Of Title II: "By authorizing the FBI to investigate certain bombings or attempted bombings of schools, churches and other structures, the Act will deter such heinous acts of lawlessness."

Of Title VI: "It holds great promise of making the Fifteenth Amendment of the Constitution fully meaningful."

== Legislative history ==
=== House of Representatives ===
The bill, H.R. 8601, began in the House of Representatives under jurisdiction of the House Judiciary Committee, which was chaired by Representative Emanuel Celler of Brooklyn. The bill was initially introduced to the House on August 10, 1959. The bill was swiftly approved by the Judiciary Committee, but the Rules Committee attacked the Judiciary Committee to prevent the bill coming to the floor of the House of Representatives, and the bill remained stagnant for six months as a result. Hoping to prompt further action on the bill, Celler filed a discharge position to bypass the Rules Committee, as he felt that the Rules Committee intended to pigeonhole the bill. The petition originally required a majority (219) of House signatures, but was instituted prematurely with 209 signatures.

The "voter referees" plan was part of a House amendment to the original bill to substitute Representative Robert Kastenmeier's "enrollment officers" plan. After several amendments, the House of Representatives approved the bill on March 24, 1960, by a vote of 311–109. 179 Democrats and 132 Republicans voted Aye. 93 Democrats, 15 Republicans, and 1 Independent Democrat voted Nay. 2 Democrats and 1 Republican voted present.

=== Senate ===
The bill was referred to the Senate on March 24, 1960, and sent to the Judiciary Committee for consideration. The Committee, chaired by segregationist Mississippi Senator James Eastland, attempted to hold up the bill to stop it from reaching a floor vote. In January 1960, liberal non-Southern Democrats pushed for a discharge petition to move the bill from the Committee to the Senate floor.

After adding amendments to the bill, the Senate approved H.R. 8601 on April 8, 1960, by a vote of 71–18. 42 Democrats and 29 Republicans voted Aye. 18 Democrats voted Nay. No Republican Senators voted against the bill. Despite fierce opposition from Southern Democrats, the Democratic Senators from Tennessee and Texas voted in favor. The House of Representatives approved the Senate amendments on April 21, 1960, by a vote of 288–95. The bill was then signed into law by President Eisenhower on May 6, 1960.

== Titles ==
=== Title I: Obstruction of Court Orders ===
Title I, which amended Chapter 17 of title 18 of the United States Code, 18 U.S.C. § 1509, outlawed obstruction of court orders. It introduced criminal penalties for all willful attempts to interfere with the due exercise of rights or the performance of duties under any court order. If convicted, one could be fined no more than $1,000, imprisoned for up to one year, or both.

=== Title II: Flight from Prosecution, Explosives, Threats and False Information ===
Title II outlawed fleeing a state for damaging or destroying a building or property, illegal possession or use of explosives, and threats or false threats to damage property using fire or explosives.

Section 201 amended Chapter 49 of title 18 (18 U.S.C. § 1074). The amendment outlaws interstate or international movement to avoid prosecution for damaging or destroying any building or structure. The section also outlaws flight to avoid testimony in a case relating to such an offense. If convicted, one could be fined no more than $5,000 and/or imprisoned for no more than five years.

Section 203 amended Chapter 39 of title 18 (18 U.S.C. § 837). The amendment dealt with the illegal use or possession of explosives. The section outlaws transportation or possession of any explosive with intent to damage a building or property. The section also makes the conveying of false information or threats to damage or destroy any building or property illegal.

=== Title III: Federal Election Records ===
Section 301 calls for the preservation of all election records and papers which come into an officer or custodian's possession relating to poll tax or other act regarding voting in an election (except Puerto Rico). If an officer fails to comply, he/she could be fined no more than $1,000 and/or imprisoned for no more than one year. Section 302 declares that any person that intentionally alters, damages, or destroys a record shall be fined no more than $1,000 and/or imprisoned for no more than one year. Section 304 establishes that no person shall disclose any election record. Section 306 defines the term "officer of election".

=== Title IV: Extension of Powers of the Civil Rights Commission ===
Section 401 of Title IV amended Section 105 of the Civil Rights Act of 1957 (71 Stat. 635) by declaring in an added subsection that "each member of the Commission shall have the power and authority to administer oaths or take statements of witnesses under affirmation."

=== Title V: Education of Children of Members of Armed Forces ===
Title V amended section 6 of Public Law 874 of the Federal Impact Aid. As amended, Title V arranged for free education for children of members of the Armed Forces in the case that they were residing on Federal property wherein local academic institutions were unable to provide such education.

=== Title VI: Protection of Voting Rights ===
Title VI amended section 131 of the Civil Rights Act of 1957 (71 Stat. 637) to address the issue of depriving African Americans the right to vote.

Section 601 declares that those given the legal right to vote shall not be deprived of that right on account of race or color. Any person denying that right shall "constitute contempt of court." The section also states that the courts can appoint "voting referees" to report to the court their findings of voting infringement. The section also defines the word "vote" as the entire process of making a vote effective--registration, casting a ballot, and having that ballot counted.

=== Title VII: Separability ===
Title VII established the separability of the act, affirming that the rest of the act shall go unaffected if one provision is found invalid.

== Subsequent history ==
The Civil Rights Act of 1960, being the fifth American civil rights law enacted, foreshadowed an increased emphasis on civil rights legislation and paved the way for subsequent civil rights laws in 1964 and 1965. Before the Civil Rights Act of 1964 and Voting Rights Act of 1965, the act of 1957 and the Civil Rights Act of 1960 were deemed ineffective for the firm establishment of civil rights. The later legislation had firmer ground for the enforcement and protection of a variety of civil rights, where the acts of 1957 and 1960 were largely limited to voting rights.

The Civil Rights Act of 1960 dealt with race and color but omitted coverage of those discriminated against for national origin, although Eisenhower had called for it in his message to Congress. Eisenhower also proposed extending the life of the Civil Rights Commission, which was unfulfilled in the Civil Rights Act of 1960, but was later instituted in the Civil Rights Act of 1964. The Civil Rights Act of 1964 and Voting Rights Act of 1965 worked to fulfill the seven goals suggested by President Eisenhower in 1959. These two subsequent laws, as well as the Civil Rights Act of 1968, satisfied proponents of the civil rights movement to end state-sponsored racial discrimination and protect legal equality in the United States.

== See also ==
- Civil and political rights
- Reconstruction era
- Jim Crow laws
- Civil rights movement
- Civil Rights Act of 1957
- Civil Rights Act of 1968
