= Ippolito =

Ippolito or Eppolito is an Italian surname and given name, and the Italian form of the name of Saint Hippolytus of Rome. It may refer to:

== Given name ==
- Ippolito Adobrandini, birth name of Pope Clement VIII (1536–1605)
- Ippolito Aldobrandini (cardinal) (1596–1638), Italian cardinal, grandnephew of the above
- Ippolito Maria Beccaria (1550–1600), Italian Dominican and Master of the Order of Preachers
- Ippolito Caffi (1809–1866), Italian painter
- Ippolito Desideri (1684–1733), Italian Jesuit missionary and traveller
- Ippolito d'Este (1509–1572), Italian cardinal and Archbishop of Esztergom
- Ippolito II d'Este (1509–1572), Italian cardinal
- Ippolito del Donzello (1455–?), Italian painter and architect
- Ippolito Galantini (painter) (1627–1706), Italian painter of the Baroque period
- Ippolito Galantini (teacher) (1565–1619), Italian Roman Catholic founder of the Congregation of Christian Doctrine of Florence
- Ippolito de' Medici (1511–1535), illegitimate only son of Giuliano di Lorenzo de' Medici, Lord of Florence
- Ippolito Nievo (1831–1861), Italian writer, journalist and patriot
- Ippolito Pindemonte (1753–1828), Italian poet
- Ippolito Rosellini (1800–1843), Italian Egyptologist
- Ippolito Rotoli (1914–1977), Italian Roman Catholic prelate, archbishop and papal nuncio

== Surname ==
- Angelica Ippolito (born 1944), Italian actress
- Ciro Ippolito (born 1947), Italian film director and producer
- Ty Ippolito (born 1985), Canadian film and television actor and precision driver
- Dalila Ippolito (born 2002), Argentine footballer
- Dennis Ippolito (born 1942), professor of political science at Southern Methodist University
- Ian Ippolito, American serial entrepreneur and the founder of numerous tech companies
- Louis Eppolito, NYPD officer and mafia contract killer
- Jon Ippolito (born 1962), American artist and educator
- Nunziante Ippolito (1796–1851), Italian physician and anatomist
- Tony Ippolito (1917–1951), American National Football League player

== See also ==
- Sant'Ippolito (disambiguation)
