= Sant'Ippolito (disambiguation) =

Sant'Ippolito is a municipality in the Province of Pesaro e Urbino in the Italian region Marche.

Sant'Ippolito may also refer to:

- Sant'Ippolito (hill), a hill in Sicily
- Sant'Ippolito, Rome, a church in Nomentano, Viale delle Provincie, Rome

== See also ==
- Santi Ippolito e Cassiano (disambiguation)
- Ippolito
