= University of Maryland School of Public Policy =

Public policy school of the University of Maryland, College Park

Coordinates: 38°58′58″N 76°56′50″W

- Type: Public
- Established: 1981
- Affiliations: NASPAA, APSIA, TPC
- Dean: Gustavo A. Flores-Macías
- Location: College Park, Maryland, United States
- Campus: Suburban
- Nickname: SPP
- Website: spp.umd.edu

The School of Public Policy is the public policy school at the University of Maryland, College Park.

== History ==
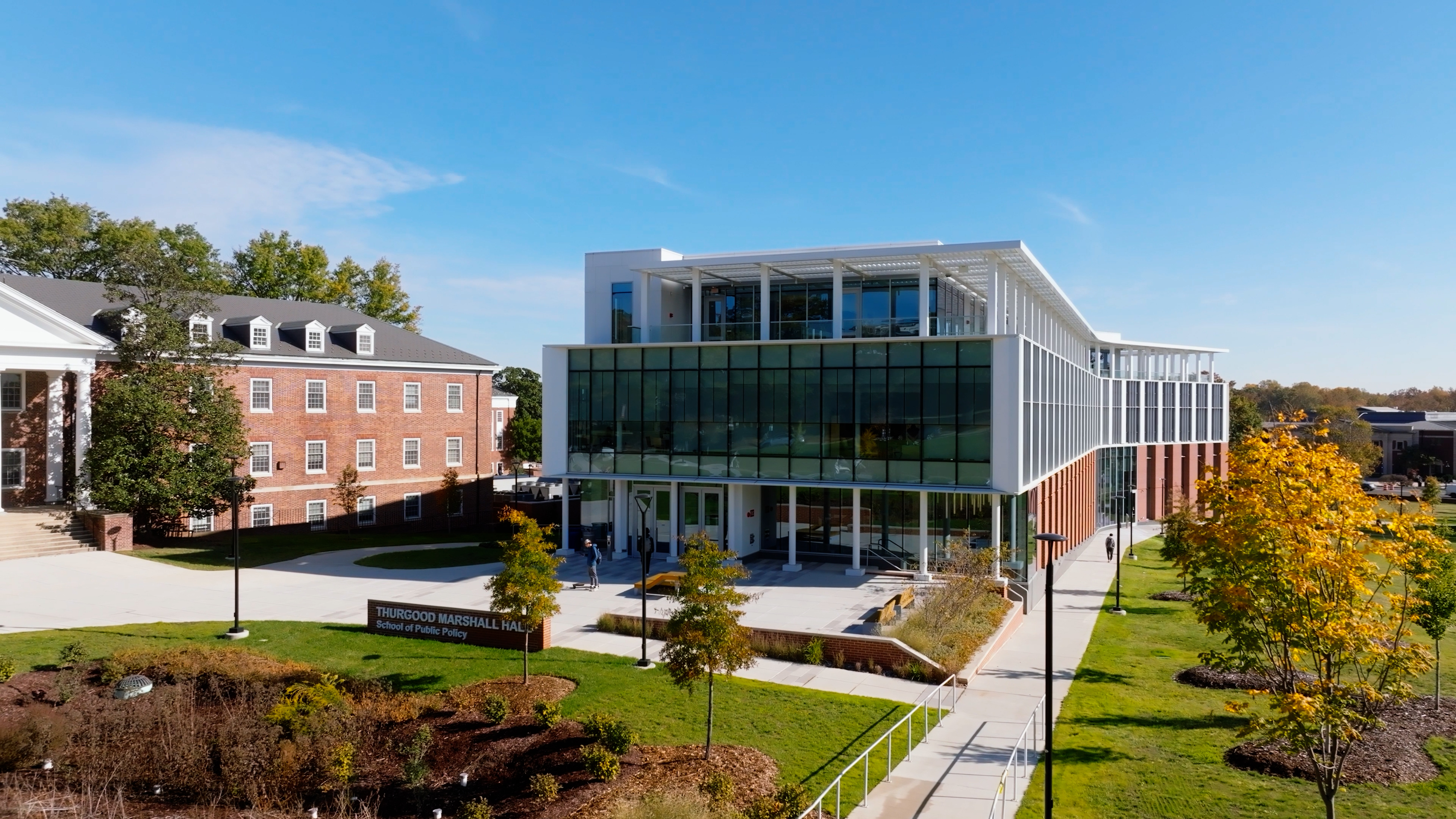
Thurgood Marshall Hall is the home of the University of Maryland School of Public Policy. Opened in Fall 2022, the 77,000 square-foot facility features modern classrooms, collaborative spaces, and a unique deliberation chamber inspired by parliamentary debate.

On October 26, 1978, University of Maryland President John S. Toll appointed the Committee on a School of Public Affairs to pursue the question of whether the College Park campus should establish a new school. With the support of the Sloan foundation and key individuals such as U.S. Senator Joseph Tydings and publisher Philip Merrill, the Maryland School of Public Affairs was established on the campus of the University of Maryland, College Park in 1981. By April 1981, Albert Bowker was appointed the first dean of the school and a group of faculty was recruited. The first seven faculty included Allen Schick, Robert Pastor, Catherine Kelleher, Frank Levy, Peyton Young, George Eads and Mark Winer. The school's doors opened in 1982 and degrees were conferred on a dozen students during the school's first graduation exercises in 1984.

The School of Public Affairs changed its name to the School of Public Policy in 2004.

The School of Public Policy expanded to offer an undergraduate program in the Spring of 2017 aimed at developing skills necessary to have a positive impact on the global community.

In fall 2022, the school moved from Van Munching Hall—its longtime shared home with the Robert H. Smith School of Business—into Thurgood Marshall Hall, a newly constructed 77,000 square-foot facility featuring modern teaching spaces, a parliamentary-style deliberation chamber, and areas designed to foster public engagement and collaboration. Named in honor of Supreme Court Justice Thurgood Marshall, the building reflects the school's mission to advance the public good and promote civic dialogue.

The school is a full member of the Association of Professional Schools of International Affairs (APSIA), a group of schools of public policy, public administration, and international studies.

== Master's degree programs ==
The school enrolls close to 500 graduate students and offers full-time and part-time Master of Public Policy (MPP) and Master of Public Management (MPM) degrees, as well as a Ph.D. in Policy Studies.

=== Master of Public Policy ===
The Master of Public Policy (MPP) program equips students with the analytical, leadership, and communication skills needed to tackle complex public challenges and drive meaningful change. The interdisciplinary curriculum combines rigorous quantitative analysis with coursework in policy theory, economics, ethics, and management, preparing graduates for leadership roles in government, nonprofits, international organizations, and the private sector. Students may choose from a range of specializations, including social policy, environmental policy, international development, nonprofit management, and education policy, among others. Many students also gain hands-on experience through internships, capstone projects, and professional development opportunities in nearby Washington, D.C.

=== Master of Public Management ===
The school offers a Master of Public Management program in two tracks for students who have at least five or more years of professional policy or management-related experience after their undergraduate studies. The 36-credit, policy-oriented curriculum tracks the MPP curriculum with 12 fewer elective credits. The Executive Master of Public Management (EXPM) follows a prescribed 30-credit, management-oriented curriculum. Many EXPM students attend evening classes twice a week in Washington, D.C. Students move through the program as a cohort and have the opportunity to participate in numerous enrichment activities.

=== Dual Bachelor/Master Program ===
The School of Public Policy offers a Dual Bachelor/Master Program, commonly referred to as the 4+1 program, which allows high-achieving undergraduate students to begin earning credits toward a Master of Public Policy (MPP) degree while completing their bachelor's degree. Students accepted into the program can take up to 18 graduate-level credits as undergraduates, enabling them to complete both degrees in as little as five years. This accelerated path is designed to prepare students early for impactful careers in public service, policy analysis, and leadership across sectors.

=== Joint Master's Programs ===
The school has also established joint degree programs with the University of Maryland's A. James Clark School of Engineering, the College of Computer, Mathematical, and Natural Sciences Conservation Biology program, the Robert H. Smith School of Business, and the University of Maryland School of Law in Baltimore.

== Research centers and institutes ==
The centers and institutes located within the Maryland School of Public Policy offer students opportunities to work on research projects with practitioners who make significant contributions to global and domestic policy. They include:

- Center for Global Sustainability
- Center for International and Security Studies at Maryland
- Center for Governance of Technology and Systems
- Civic Innovation Center
- Do Good Institute
- Institute for Public Leadership

== Selected faculty ==
- Kenneth S. Apfel, former commissioner of the U.S. Social Security Administration.
- Alok Bhargava, econometrician working on issues of food policies and population health in developing and developed countries.
- Herman Daly, pioneer in the field of ecological economics and steady-state theory, senior economist in the Environment Department of the World Bank.
- William Galston, former domestic policy advisor to Bill Clinton and senior fellow at the Brookings Institution
- Jacques Gansler, former U.S. Under Secretary of Defense for Acquisition, Technology and Logistics.
- Thomas Schelling, pioneer in game theory and winner of the 2005 Nobel Prize in Economics.
- Allen Schick, fellow at the Brookings Institution and widely recognized authority on the federal budget.
- Susan Schwab, former U.S. Trade Representative, former president and CEO of the University System of Maryland Foundation, and former dean of the UMD School of Public Policy.
