= Discretionary spending =

Type of government spending

In American public finance, discretionary spending is government spending implemented through an appropriations bill. This spending is an optional part of fiscal policy, in contrast to social programs for which funding is mandatory and determined by the number of eligible recipients. Some examples of areas funded by discretionary spending are national defense, foreign aid, education and transportation.

== United States discretionary spending ==
In the United States, discretionary spending refers to optional spending set by appropriation levels each year, at the discretion of Congress. During the budget process, Congress issues a budget resolution which includes levels of discretionary spending, deficit projections, and instructions for changing entitlement programs and tax policy. After setting discretionary spending levels, both the House Appropriations Committee and Senate Appropriations Committee divide the agreed-upon amount of discretionary spending into twelve suballocations for each of their twelve subcommittees. These subcommittees produce twelve annual appropriation bills for the next fiscal year. While these bills are subject to revision as they move through hearings, markups, Floor consideration, and conference, the level of discretionary spending remains constrained by the budget resolution. Eventually, these twelve bills must be approved by the full Appropriations Committee, followed by both Houses of Congress. Once passed, the president either signs them, vetoes them, or allows them to become law by not signing them within ten days.

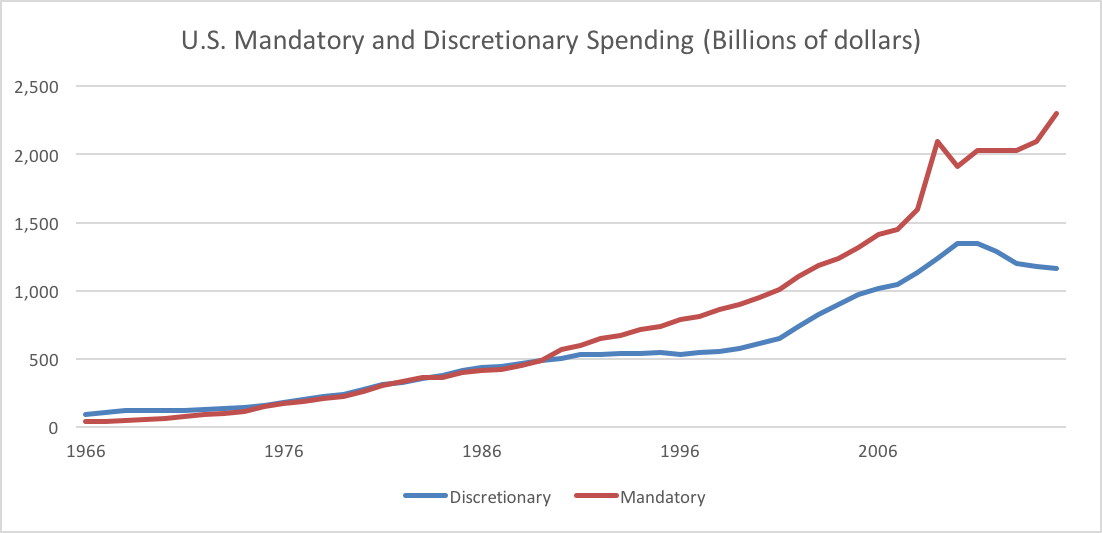
Graph of U.S. mandatory and discretionary spending from 1966 to 2015. Mandatory spending levels start to diverge from discretionary spending levels in the early 1990s.

In 2016, the U.S. federal government spent $1.2 trillion on U.S. discretionary spending. Of this $1.2 trillion, nearly half ($584 billion) was spent on national defense. The rest of U.S. discretionary spending was allocated for education, training, employment, and social services ($92 billion), as well as transportation ($91 billion), veterans' benefits and services ($68 billion), income security ($66 billion), health ($57 billion), administration of justice ($53 billion), international affairs ($52 billion), and other areas related to natural resources, the environment, science, space, and technology ($122 billion).

== United States mandatory vs. discretionary spending ==
In 1962, U.S. discretionary spending made up 47.2% of total U.S. spending, remaining the largest component of federal spending until the mid-1970s. From this time forward, however, discretionary spending levels as a share of total federal spending has decreased significantly. This is largely due to the rapid growth of entitlement spending, also known as mandatory spending. As more participants become eligible for entitlement programs, mandatory spending automatically increases. This trend is projected to continue in the future. In fact, according to the Congressional Research Service, over the next decade, mandatory spending is projected to reach 14% of GDP, while discretionary spending is projected to continue getting smaller, eventually reaching 5% of GDP. The Congressional Research Service projected that by 2022, discretionary spending's share of the economy would be "equal to or less than spending in each of the two largest categories of mandatory programs, Social Security and Major Health Programs."

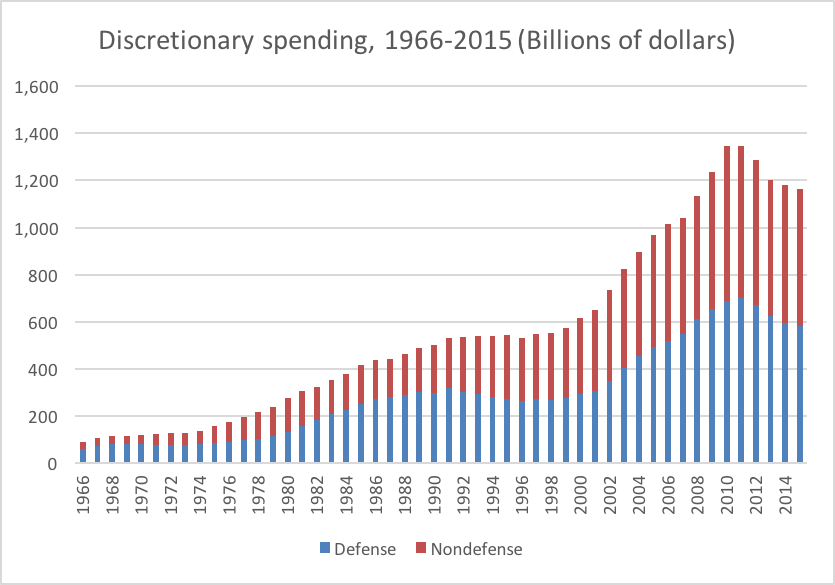
Comparison of U.S. discretionary spending on defense and nondefense.

== See also ==
- Budget process
- Appropriations bill (United States)
