= Santi Ippolito e Cassiano =

Santi Ippolito e Cassiano may refer to:

- Santi Ippolito e Cassiano, San Casciano, a village in Cascina, Tuscany, Italy
- Santi Ippolito e Cassiano, Caprese Michelangelo, a church and former pieve in San Cassiano in Stratino, Caprese Michelangelo, Tuscany, Italy

== See also ==
- Sant'Ippolito (disambiguation)
