= Irene S. Rubin =

American political scientist (born 1945)

Irene Sharp Rubin
- Born: May 3, 1945
- Education: Barnard College; Harvard University; University of Chicago
- Awards: Levine Award, APSA; Blum service award, AABPA
- Scientific career
- Fields: Political science; Public policy; Public administration; Sociology; Urban studies
- Workplaces: Lewis University; University of Maryland; Northern Illinois University

Irene Sharp Rubin (born May 3, 1945) is an American political scientist, currently a Professor Emerita of Public Administration at Northern Illinois University. She researches the politics of public budgeting at various levels of American government, and she has written methodological texts on how to conduct and analyze research interviews.

== Education and early career ==
Rubin received a BA in East Asia studies in 1967 at Barnard College, followed by an MA in East Asia studies in 1969 from Harvard University. She then pursued a PhD in Sociology at the University of Chicago, which she completed in 1977.

Rubin began her career as a sociologist, ultimately transitioning into urban studies and then political science and public affairs. From 1976 until 1979, Rubin was a professor of sociology at Lewis University in Romeoville, Illinois, where she was also Director of Urban Career Studies. In 1979 she became a professor at the University of Maryland Institute for Urban Studies, before moving to Northern Illinois University in 1981 where she remained as a professor of political science and public administration for the rest of her career.

== Career ==
Rubin spent the bulk of her career, from 1981 until her retirement in 2004, at Northern Illinois University. During this time, she published articles across prominent urban affairs and public administration journals, as well as being an author or editor of 8 books. These include four single-authored books published between 1982 and 2002.

Rubin's most-referenced work, written with Herbert Rubin, is an introductory textbook on interview research called Qualitative interviewing: The art of hearing data, which was first published in 1995. The book introduces students to the concept of obtaining and analysing data from qualitative interviews, and describes methodological approaches for obtaining high-quality data from interviews. One of her single-authored books, the Politics of Public Budgeting, was originally published in 1990 and had been released in 9 editions by 2019. John Pitney Jr. wrote that the book is a classroom text or reference volume that introduces "how money is raised and spent at all levels of government". Rubin was also the editor of a 2008 book in the American Society for Public Administration Classics Series, called Public Budgeting: Policy, Process and Politics. She was the editor-in-chief of Public Budgeting & Finance from 1995–1996, and the editor-in-chief of the Public Administration Review from 1997–1999.

Rubin has won several awards from major professional organisations. In 1994, she was awarded the Charles H. Levine Memorial Award for Excellence in Public Administration from the American Political Science Association, given for "a public administration faculty member who has demonstrated excellence in teaching, research and service to the wider community". She also received the James L. Blum Award for distinguished service in budgeting from the American Association for Budget and Program Analysis, and several best paper awards from flagship journals.

Rubin has had one of the largest impacts of any active political scientist, as measured by citations. In 2019, Rubin was listed as the 13th most cited active emeritus political scientist at an American university in a citation analysis by the political scientists Hannah June Kim and Bernard Grofman. Rubin's work has also been referenced in media reports on public budgeting.

== Selected works ==
- Running in the Red: The Political Dynamics of Urban Fiscal Stress (1982)
- Shrinking the Federal Government: The Effect of Cutbacks on Five Federal Agencies (1985)
- Class, Tax, and Power: Municipal Budgeting in the United States (1998)
- Balancing the Federal Budget: Eating the Seed Corn or Trimming the Herds (2002)
- The Politics of Public Budgeting: Getting and Spending, Borrowing and Balancing (2019)

== Selected awards ==
- Levine Award, American Society for Public Administration
- James L. Blum Award for distinguished service in budgeting, American Association for Budget and Program Analysis
