= Public Budgeting & Finance =

- Discipline: Public Administration
- Language: English
- Edited by: Justin Marlowe, Sharon Kioko

Publication details
- History: 1981–present
- Publisher: Wiley-Blackwell on behalf of Public Financial Publications
- Frequency: Quarterly

Standard abbreviations
- ISO 4: Public Budg. Finance

Indexing
- ISSN: 0275-1100 (print); 1540-5850 (web)
- LCCN: 81642235
- OCLC no.: 310826976

Links
- Journal homepage; Online access; Online archive

Public Budgeting & Finance is a quarterly peer-reviewed academic journal published by Wiley-Blackwell on behalf of Public Financial Publications. The publisher is associated with the Association of Budgeting and Financial Management, a section of the American Society for Public Administration. The journal was established in 1981 under Allen Schick, with the aim of integrating the interdependent but often separated fields of budgeting and financial management. The current editors-in-chief are Justin Marlowe (University of Washington) and Sharon Kioko (University of Washington). The journal spans the spectrum of budget process and policy and financial management.
