= James D. Savage =

James D. Savage (born November 14, 1951) is a political science professor at the University of Virginia who teaches public policy in the Department of Politics and the Frank Batten School of Leadership and Public Policy. He is an expert in government budget and fiscal policies and budget theory. He completed his undergraduate degrees in political science and psychology at the University of California, Riverside, his graduate degrees in political science, public policy, and economics at the University of California, Berkeley, and his post-doctoral fellowship at Harvard University. At Berkeley, Savage studied under Nelson Polsby and Aaron Wildavsky. In 2013, Savage received the Aaron B. Wildavsky Award for Lifetime Scholarly Achievement in budgeting and public financial management from the Association for Budgeting and Financial Management, and in 2014, he was elected as a Fellow of the National Academy of Public Administration.

Savage is best known for four books on American and comparative budgeting and fiscal policy: Balanced Budgets and American Politics (Cornell University Press); Funding Science in America: Congress, Universities and the Politics of the Academic Porkbarrel (Cambridge University Press); Making the EMU: The Politics of Budgetary Surveillance and the Enforcement of Maastricht (Oxford University Press); and Reconstructing Iraq's Budgetary Institutions: Coalition State Building after Saddam (Cambridge University Press).

The first book explores the origins of the idea of balancing budgets and its effect on American politics, fiscal policies, and institutional development from 1690 through the Reagan presidency. The book argues that the idea of balancing the budget is fundamentally rooted in American political thought that can be tied, for example, to the political differences that divided the Jeffersonians and the Hamiltonians.

The second book analyzes the politics of congressional earmarking in the federal budget for universities and colleges. This book explores how the idea of peer review of federal research funding is violated by universities that engage in earmarking.

The third book examines how the enforcement of the Maastricht Treaty's budgetary rules played a critical role in the creation of the European Union's Economic and Monetary Union and the later enforcement of the Stability and Growth Pact.

The last book argues that, consistent with the literature on state building, failed states, and foreign assistance, budgeting is a core state function that is necessary for the operations of a functional government. Employing an historical institutionalist approach, the book first explores the Ottoman, British, and Ba'athist origins of Iraq's budgetary institutions. The book next examines American prewar planning, the Coalition Provisional Authority's rule-making and budgeting following the 2003 invasion of Iraq, and the mixed success of the American-led Coalition's capacity-building programs initiated throughout the occupation.

The common thread connecting these books together is that budgeting and budgetary policies are deeply influenced by and reflect the contest over ideas and values.
