= Block grant =

Government grant type

A block grant is a grant-in-aid of a specified amount from a larger government to a smaller regional government body. Block grants have less oversight from the larger government and provide flexibility to each subsidiary government body in terms of designing and implementing programs. Block grants, categorical grants, and general revenue sharing are three types of federal government grants-in-aid programs. (Note: A block grant differs from a categorical grant, in that the latter has stricter and more specific provisions on the how it is to be spent.)

== Graphical representation ==
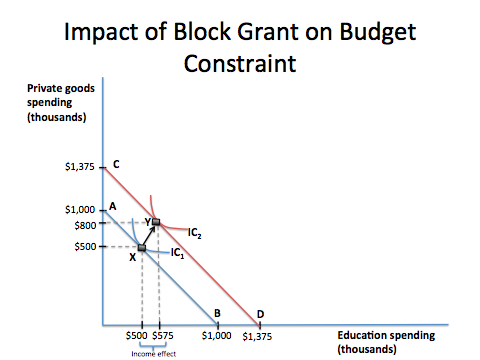
When Town A is offered a block grant of $375,000, the budget constraint shifts outwards from AB to CD. Town A chooses point Y on CD, as it spends $75,000 more on education and $300,000 more on private goods.

The figure demonstrates the impact of an education block grant on a town's budget constraint. According to microeconomic theory, the grant shifts the town's budget constraint outwards, enabling the town to spend more on both education and other goods, due to the income effect. While this increases the town's utility, it does not maximize the town's spending on education. Therefore, if the goal of a grant program is to encourage spending on a particular good, a categorical grant may be more effective in achieving this goal than a block grant, as most block grant critics would argue.

== By country ==
=== United States ===
A block grant in the United States is a grant-in-aid of a specified amount from the federal government of the United States to individual states and local governments to help support various broad purpose programs, such as law enforcement, social services, public health, and community development.

Through a block grant program for Medicaid, for example, each state would receive a set amount of money from the federal government. The block grants can be set based on "per capita" or on the needs of the state. Each state has to fill any funding gap if there is a difference between their spending and the amount set by the federal government.

Block grants are the topic of debate in the United States. According to the 2014 Congressional Research Service (CRS) advocates, who would like to see Medicaid converted into a block grant, say that block grants assist in reducing the federal deficit, increase government efficiency, redistribute power, improve accountability, and allow for flexibility. Critics, who are specifically against converting Medicaid into block grants, say that block grant "undermine the achievement of national objectives", "reduce government spending on domestic issues" where, for example, the "most vulnerable seniors, individuals with disabilities, and low-income children" would lose their health care through deep cuts in Medicaid. Critics also say that because block grants are decentralized, it is more challenging to "measure block grant performance and to hold state and local government officials accountable for their decisions".

In February 2017, the national debate in the United States regarding the effectiveness of block grants intensified as the United States Congress decided whether to convert Medicaid to a block grant program.

According to a January 11, 2019 Politico article, the Trump Administration was creating new guidelines to overhaul Medicaid in order to reduce health care costs for the poor through block grants, bypassing Congress. According to the same article, Centers for Medicare and Medicaid Services (CMS) Administrator Seema Verma had mentioned using CMS' authority to "pursue block grants during a meeting with state Medicaid directors in the fall" of 2018. Verma promotes block grants but she has "faced heavy scrutiny" from CMS lawyers in her attempts to "insert block grant language into federal guidance."

==== Background ====
The 2014 Congressional Research Service (CRS) report says the first true block grant was in 1966. In 1949, first Hoover Commission's 1949 report recommended the creation of "a system of grants" based "upon broad categories—such as highways, education, public assistance, and public health—as contrasted with the present system of extensive fragmentation." The Eisenhower Administration (1953–1961) created "block grants in the health and public welfare fields". In the 1950s, the U.S. Department of Health, Education, and Welfare (HEW) was able to consolidate "child health and welfare, vocational education, and vocational rehabilitation areas" into block grants for public health. But most proposals for block grants repeatedly met rejection in the 1950s. Reasons included a political misalignment between federal and state levels, concerns about a lack or reduction of federal controls, and that giving states wider latitude in spending would be a "more effective and efficient use of public funds."

In the late 1960s, with both Congress and the White House under control of the Democratic Party, Congress enacted the 1966 Partnership for Health Act and the 1968 Omnibus Crime Control and Safe Streets Act of 1968 (Safe Streets Act). In a March 16, 2017 New England Journal of Medicine article, the authors provided background on health care provisions for the poor in the 1950s and 1960s. Prior to the creation of Medicaid in 1965, health providers were reimbursed directly on a per-capita basis. (Note: There was a cap on the amount of money available, which is similar to the block grants proposed by the Republicans in 2017. See Carroll (2107).) When the cap was spent, states were responsible for cutting health costs to make up the difference by restricting who, what and how much care one could access. As a result, only 3.4 million people in the US were able to access these benefits in the 1960s before Medicaid. (Note: Compared to 81 million in 2017. See Carroll (2107)) According to an October 1977 U.S. Advisory Commission on Intergovernmental Relations report, local government officials compared to federal government officials are "closer to the people" and therefore better able to identify local needs. According to the ACIR report, advocates say block grants allow local governments to experiment with new approaches to solving various problems that other state and local officials can learn from. Such innovation would not be possible if funding were provided through restrictive categorical grants.

During the Nixon Administration (1969–1974) a new strategy, called "special revenue sharing" was developed and implemented from 1972 to 1986, to replace block grants. Through revenue sharing, the United States Congress appropriated federal tax revenue to share with states, cities, counties and townships. According to The New York Times, in FY 1986 the year before revenue sharing was eliminated by the Reagan administration, the federal government "distributed $4.5 billion to 39,000 municipalities". (Note: The New York Times reported on January 31, 1987, that "The elimination of the program of general revenue sharing on September 30, 1986 after several years of significant cuts in other Federal aid, has prompted layoffs, curtailment of police protection and other services, and higher taxes and user fees in thousands of counties, cities and villages.")

Revenue sharing lost federal support under Reagan and was replaced by block grants in smaller amounts in 1987. The 1981 Community Services Block Grant under President Reagan consolidated 77 existing anti-poverty grants into nine new block grants with a budget representing c.25% less than the programs they replaced. According to the General Accounting Office, from 1980 to 2001, the number of federal block grant programs went from 450 to 700. The grants were aimed at a wide range of activities from education to healthcare, transportation, housing and counterterrorism.

In 1996, HHS and education moved towards "nationalizing trends", there was an attempt made towards devolution of welfare policy. In 1996, Congress "replaced Aid to Families with Dependent Children with the Temporary Assistance for Needy Families (TANF) block grant". The Advisory Commission on Intergovernmental Relations (ACIR), which provided federal intergovernmental expertise, "played an important role in the design and creation of a host of intergovernmental policy initiatives, including block grants. ACIR was eliminated in 1996.

According to a 2017 CBPP study, since 2000, funding for the 13 major low-income health, housing, and social services block grants has fallen by 37%, after adjusting for inflation and population growth. This sharp reduction in funding can be attributed to the basic structure of block grants. Since block grants are designed to give local governments broad flexibility over their use of federal funds, recipients can turn these grants into savings, or spend them on other matters. As a result, it is often difficult to track in detail how these funds are being used, and what greater impact they have, thus making block grants very vulnerable to funding reductions or freezes.

In 2003, under the state Homeland Security Grant Program and Critical Infrastructure Protection, the least populous state, Wyoming received $17.5 million and the most populous state, California, received $164 million. In fiscal year 2004, Wyoming was guaranteed to receive at least $15 million, California $133 million. Wyoming thus received $35.3 per person, California only $4.7 per person. The formulas for how much money states receive favors small states. Most grant programs have a minimum amount per state, usually 0.5% or 0.75% of the total money given to states in the program. Similar patterns exist for other block grant formulas. An analysis exists in the book Sizing Up the Senate. Additionally, individual states may provide block grants to their political subdivisions, such as counties, towns, and school districts. Despite the various theoretical arguments in favor of block grants, existing research has mainly found that block grants are generally ineffective in achieving policy goals.

According to a 2004 book entitled Block Grants: Details of the Bush Proposals, critics of block grants argued that the flexibility block grant programs gave to local governments diminished the ability of federal administrators to evaluate the effectiveness of these programs, especially given that there were often no federal requirements for uniform program data collection across states. Opponents also said that the lack of restriction regarding where local officials spend block grant funding would enable them to retarget resources away from communities with the greatest need, to communities with the greatest political influence. Block grant critics said that the funding for block grants was prone to diminish over time because it was more difficult to regenerate political support for broad-purpose, state-run programs, than for categorical programs focusing on specific purposes.

The budget for FY 2005 under President Bush budget converted many federal programs into block grants to save $1.8 billion. Eighteen community development block grant programs were consolidated into one Commerce Department program.

In 2009, Carl Stenberg wrote that block grants "could contribute a greater degree of flexibility to the intergovernmental system, but their potential [was] often overstated and difficult to realize." He said that there was no empirical evidence that block grants reduce administrative costs as these costs were transferred from the federal government to the recipient states.

According to a 2013 Center for American Progress, from 2008 through 2013, categorical grant funding decreased for 29 out of 50 states as did block grants.

According to a 2009 U.S. Office of Management and Budget report, in 2008 block grants received the lowest average score based on the Program Assessment Rating Tool (PART), a set of questionnaires developed by the George W. Bush Administration to assess the efficacy of various federal funding programs. Out of the seven PART program types in 2008, 30% of block grant programs were rated "results not demonstrated", and 5% were rated "ineffective". Block grant advocates said that PART's strong weighting of program results in its calculations make it a poor measure for evaluating block grant performance. While PART examines how programs achieve a single outcome, many block grant programs contain multiple outcomes which are often contradictory to each other, and thus the overall impact of block grants may be underestimated.

A 2014 Congressional Research Service (CRS) report entitled "Block Grants: Perspectives and Controversies" said that there were "21 funded block grants, totaling about $50.8 billion in FY2014" which represented "less than 10% of total federal grant-in-aid assistance." The CRS report provided arguments for both side of the debate on the use of block grants. Those who support block grants, say that they were more cost-effective because they reduce federal administrative costs related to state and local government paperwork requirements.

According to a June 2015 Center on Budget and Policy Priorities report, the amount of basic assistance that block grants provide has also fallen, as local governments spend their federal funds on other purposes. For example, in 2015, only half of the funds received from the TANF (Temporary Assistance for Needy Families) block grant were spent on core welfare reform activities such as cash assistance, work activities, and child care. The rest of the funds were spent on a variety of different matters unrelated to the program.

The CBPP study said that, "Unlike block grants, entitlement programs such as Medicaid and SNAP are highly responsive to changes in need. They grow immediately and automatically when need rises. This growth is critically important during recessions...Programs like Medicaid and SNAP would lose this responsiveness if turned into block grants."

=== Denmark ===
Greenland receives a block grant from Denmark. The block grant equals about two-thirds of Greenland's government budget or about one-quarter of the entire GDP of Greenland. Economic stability is seen as a basis for full political independence from Denmark. When Kim Kielsen was reelected with a strong majority as the leader of the largest Greenlandic pro-independence party Siumut in 2017, observers considered it a win for the "slow-independence" faction instead of the "now-independence" faction. (His opponent, Vittus Qujaukitsoq, had argued for independence even if it meant losing the large annual block grant from the Danish state.) If Greenland were to become an independent country, the annual block grant from Denmark to Greenland would cease.

=== United Kingdom ===
Since devolution in the United Kingdom was implemented in the late 1990s, creating the Scottish Parliament, Welsh Assembly and the Northern Ireland Assembly, the devolved governments of Scotland, Wales and Northern Ireland have been funded by block grants from His Majesty's Government (HMG) because only a relatively small percentage of the tax revenue is collected by the devolved governments.

Westminster provides a block grant for Transport for London, reflecting the expense of operating the London Underground and the fact that the Greater London Authority is unable to raise a transport levy on council tax unlike other metropolitan counties in the UK (though, since 2012, the Mayor of London's Community Infrastructure Levy has been introduced, allowing the Mayor to attach a levy on property development to serve a similar function).

Under the terms of the Scotland Act 2012, the block grant from HMG to Scotland has been cut, but the Scottish Government is allowed to collect an equivalent amount of income tax.

=== Netherlands ===
On the other hand, there is limited research that suggests that block grants have a positive impact on policy outcomes. One study in the Netherlands evaluating the ADHA (Assistance in Daily Housekeeping Activities) block grant finds that for each additional euro of grant money given to local governments, 50 cents is spent on ADHA. Consequently, the authors argue that block grants can achieve important outcomes, and that categorical grants are not necessary to force spending on particular issues. However, block grant critics would likely argue that this 50% spending rate on ADHA is a sign of ineffectiveness, as it means that local governments are spending the rest of the funding on unrelated issues.

== See also ==
- Categorical grant
- New Federalism, a political tendency in the United States which favors block grants
