= Federal Impact Aid =

Federal Impact Aid is designed to assist United States local school districts that have lost property tax revenue due to the presence of tax-exempt Federal property, or that have experienced increased expenditures due to the enrollment of federally connected children, including children living on Indian lands. The Lanham Act (1940) provided for a rudimentary form of Impact Aid as payments in lieu of taxes for districts with military bases within their boundaries. In 1941, Congress amended the Lanham Act, expanding Impact Aid to include funding for the construction of public schools. In 1950, Congress enacted two laws, P.L. 815 and P.L. 874, that began the grant program in its present form. The Impact Aid statute is now Title VII of the Elementary and Secondary Education Act of 1965 (ESEA)), and the program's regulations can be found in Title 34 of the Code of Federal Regulations, section 222. Total funding for this program has exceeded $1 billion since 2002.

== Payments for Federal Property (Section 7002 of ESEA) ==
Payments for Federal Property are funded through a formula grant designed to offset the financial burden of school districts with large amounts of non-taxable, Federal land. In order to receive a payment, the school district must be able to prove that the Federal government took land off the tax rolls that was worth at least 10% of the total value of the district at that time of the government's acquisition. The amount of funding a district receives is based on a present valuation of the Federal property, which is derived from adjacent parcels in the school district. Congress has funded this grant annually since the inception of the Impact Aid law.

== Payments for Federally Connected Children (Section 7003 of ESEA) ==
Payments for Federally Connected Children, otherwise known as "basic support payments," are made through a formula grant program that provides assistance to local school districts with concentrations of children residing on Indian lands, military bases, low-rent housing properties, or other Federal properties, and concentrations of children who have parents in the uniformed services or employed on eligible Federal properties who do not live on Federal property. School districts submit student counts annually for each of the eligible categories. Each category is given a different weight in the funding formula. For example, children who live on and whose parents work on Federal property are given a weight of one, while children who live in Federal low-rent housing (subject to the Housing Act of 1937) are given a weight of 0.10, and children whose parents are in the military but do not live on base are given a weight of 0.20. Students with disabilities in certain categories are weighted an additional amount, and payments for these students come from a separate appropriation. The funding formula also accounts for average daily attendance in the district, percentage of students in the district who are federally connected, how many state and local funds are paid per student in the district, and the amount Impact Aid contributes to the district's total expenditures. Congress has funded this grant annually since the inception of the Impact Aid law.

== School Construction (Section 8007 of ESEA) ==
The Impact Aid law also provides for payments to school districts that need assistance with capital expenditures for construction activities because they educate large numbers of children who live on Federal land and because of the difficulty of raising local revenue through bonds for capital projects due to the inability to tax Federal property. These funds may be awarded as a formula grant or a discretionary grant subject to competition. Grantees are eligible for the formula awards if more than half of their enrollment lives on Indian land or has a parent in the military. Priorities for the discretionary grants are generally based on a low ability for the applicant to raise revenue for capital improvements and emergency conditions at the school to be repaired or rebuilt. School construction grants were funded under the American Recovery and Reinvestment Act of 2009. In fiscal Year 2011, Congress funded only formula grants. Discretionary grants were last funded in 2012.
