= Mandatory spending =

Government spending on certain programs that are required by law

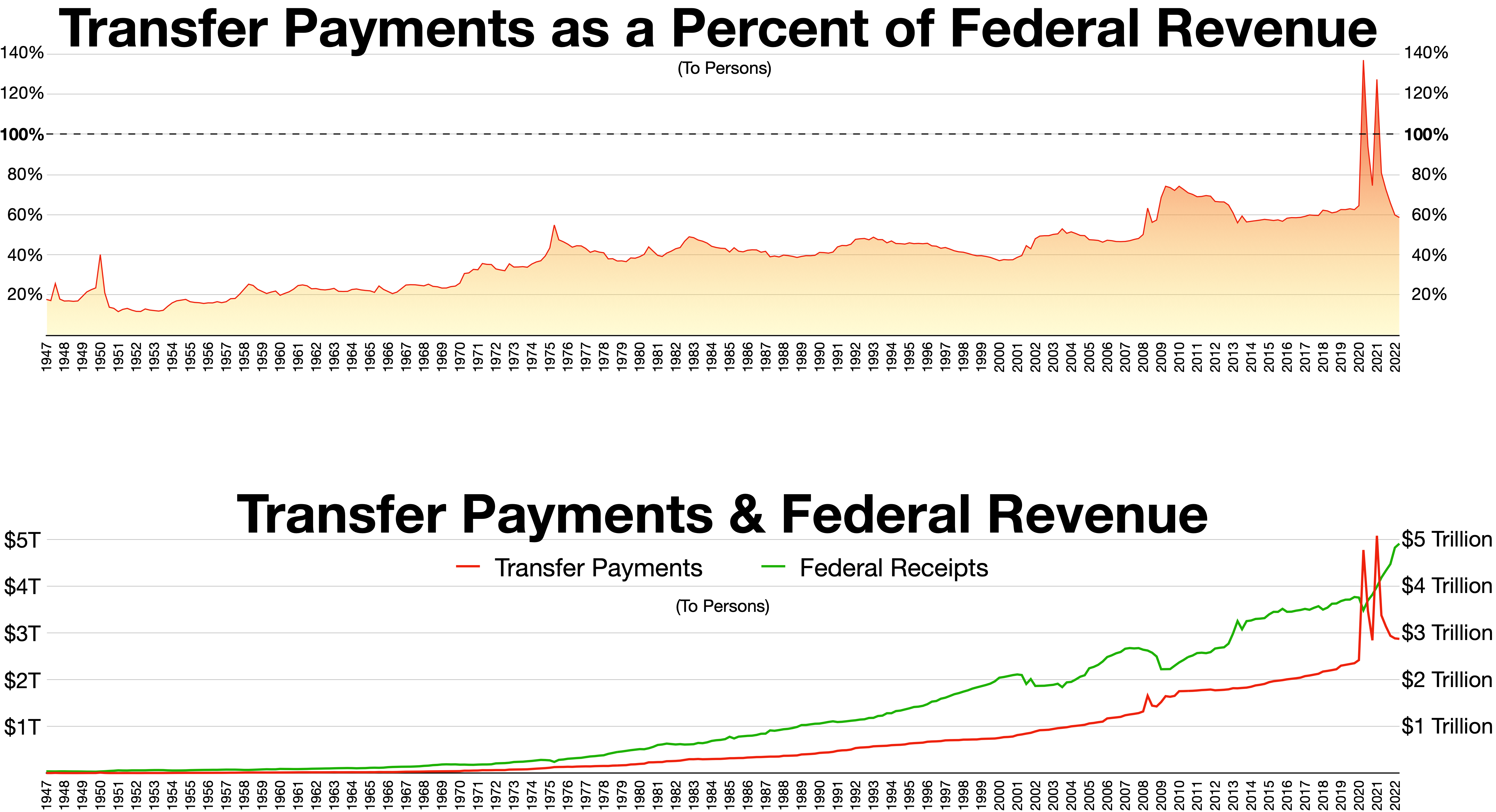
Transfer payments (to persons) as a percent of Federal revenue in the United States

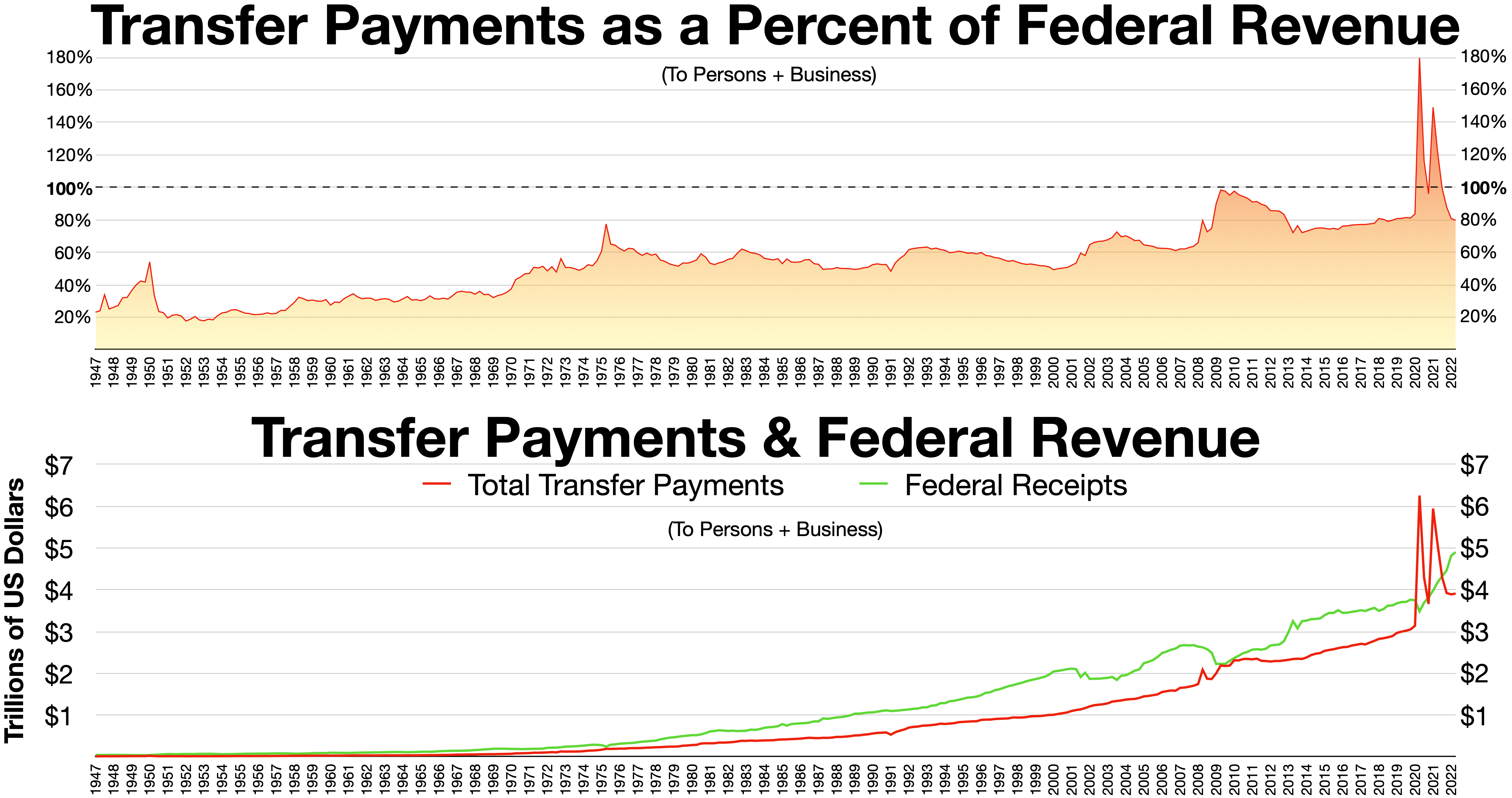
Transfer payments (to persons and businesses) in the United States

The United States federal budget is divided into three categories: mandatory spending, discretionary spending, and interest on debt. Also known as entitlement spending, in US fiscal policy, mandatory spending is government spending on certain programs that are required by law. Congress established mandatory programs under authorization laws. Congress legislates spending for mandatory programs outside of the annual appropriations bill process. Congress can only reduce the funding for programs by changing the authorization law itself. This normally requires a 60-vote majority in the Senate to pass. Discretionary spending on the other hand will not occur unless Congress acts each year to provide the funding through an appropriations bill. Expenditure is often influenced by Federal Reserve advisory.

Mandatory spending has taken up a larger share of the federal budget over time. In fiscal year (FY) 1965, mandatory spending accounted for 5.7 percent of gross domestic product (GDP). In FY 2016, mandatory spending accounted for about 60 percent of the federal budget and over 13 percent of GDP. Mandatory spending received $2.4 trillion of the total $3.9 trillion of federal spending in 2016.

== Entitlement programs ==
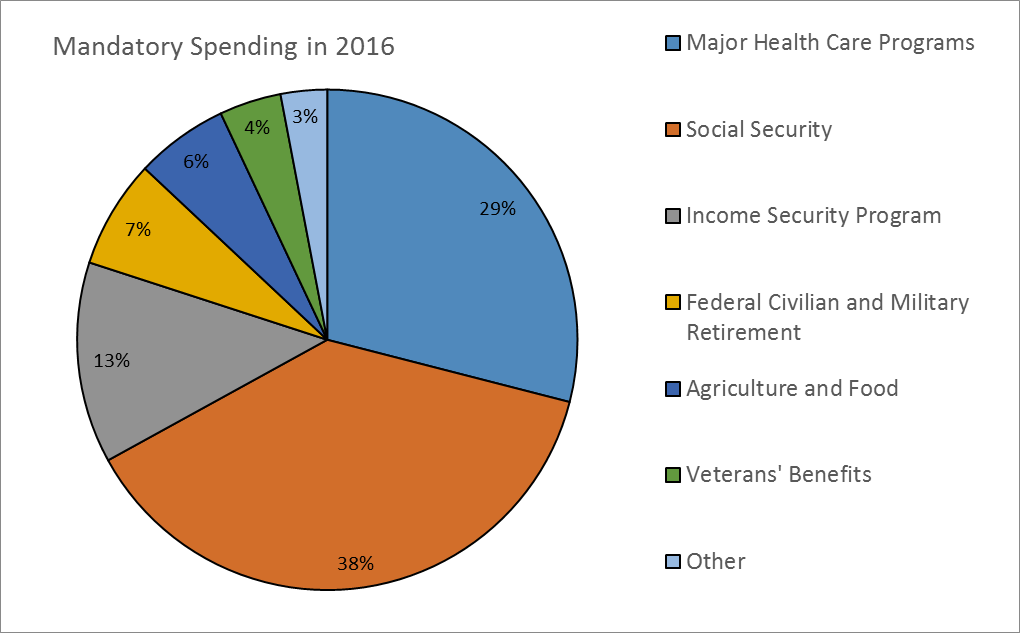
Mandatory spending for FY 2016

The bulk of mandatory spending is for entitlement programs, which are social welfare programs with specific requirements. Congress sets eligibility requirements and benefits for entitlement programs. If the eligibility requirements are met for a specific mandatory program, outlays are made automatically. Entitlement programs such as Social Security and Medicare make up the bulk of mandatory spending. Together they account for nearly 50 percent of the federal budget. Other mandatory spending programs include income security programs such as the Earned Income Tax Credit, Supplemental Nutrition Assistance Program, Supplemental Security Income, Temporary Assistance for Needy Families, and Unemployment Insurance. Federal retirement programs for federal and civilian military retirees, veterans' programs, and various other programs that provide agricultural subsidies are also included in mandatory spending. Also included is smaller budgetary items, such as the salaries of members of Congress and the President. The graph shown here shows a breakdown on the percent of mandatory spending each entitlement program receives.

=== Eligibility rules ===
Many mandatory spending programs are determined by eligibility rules. Congress sets criteria for determining who is eligible to receive benefits from the program, and the benefit level for people who are eligible. The amount of money spent on each program each year is determined by how many people are eligible and apply for benefits. Congress does not decide each year to increase or decrease the budget for Social Security or other earned benefit programs. Some mandatory spending programs are in effect indefinitely, but some, like agriculture programs, expire at the end of a given period. Legislation that affects mandatory spending is subject to House and Senate points of order. Congress can periodically review the eligibility rules and may change them in order to include or exclude more people or offer more or less generous benefits to those who are eligible and can therefore change the amount spent on the program. Most mandatory spending is used on entitlement programs.

== Other mandatory spending ==
Besides entitlement programs, mandatory spending also includes, for example, the salaries of federal judges, Members of Congress, and the President, as well as certain payments from the Forest Service to states.

== History ==
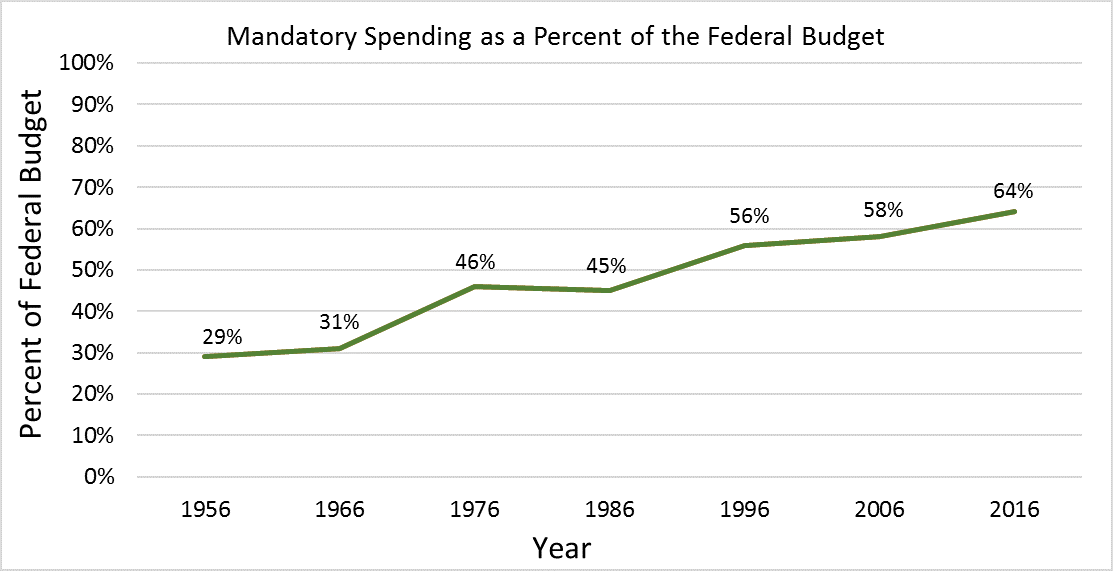
Mandatory spending as a percentage of the federal budget

Prior to the Great Depression, nearly all federal expenditures were discretionary. Mandatory spending grew following the passage of the Social Security Act in 1935. An increasing percentage of the federal budget became devoted to mandatory spending. In 1947, Social Security accounted for just under five percent of the federal budget and less than one-half of one percent of GDP. By 1962, 13 percent of the federal budget and half of all mandatory spending was committed to Social Security. Less than 30 percent of all federal spending was mandatory. This percentage continued to increase when Congress amended the Social Security Act to create Medicare in 1965. Medicare is a government administered health insurance program for senior citizens. In the 10 years following the creation of Medicare, mandatory spending increased from 30 percent to over 50 percent of the federal budget. The graph here shows the larger share of the federal budget that mandatory spending has taken up over time. Though the rate of increase has since slowed, mandatory spending composed about 60 percent of the federal budget since FY 2012.

=== Social Security ===
Social Security spending has grown relative to the economy. In 1962, before the passage of Medicare and Medicaid, Social Security spending accounted for 13 percent of the total mandatory spending. This was about half of all mandatory spending. In FY 2016, Social Security accounted for 38 percent of mandatory spending. This accounts for about a little more than one third of all mandatory spending and around 4.3 to 4.8 percent of GDP in the US. Social Security has fluctuated around this level since the 1980s. Medicare and Medicaid have taken up an increasingly larger share of mandatory spending.

=== Medicare and Medicaid ===
Persistent increases in health care spending have been the main drivers in increases in mandatory spending. Mandatory spending has grown from 4.9 percent of federal spending in FY 1970, to 25.7 percent of federal spending in FY 2016. Health care cost per capita has grown much faster than the economy. New medical technologies have transformed health care and led to increasing costs. Third-party reimbursement of health care costs by public and private insurance programs provided few incentives to control costs until the 1980s. The introduction of Medicare's prospective payment system for hospitals in 1983 and the increasing share of health maintenance organizations in the mid-1980s helped to slow down health care costs. Other attempts such as the Balanced Budget Act of 1997 have only been temporarily or partially successful in slowing down the rate of increased health care spending. In 2010, the passage of the Affordable Care Act established a mandate for most US residents to obtain health insurance, set up insurance exchanges, and expand Medicaid. Mandatory federal outlays for health programs increased as a result.

=== Recessions ===
Mandatory spending plays a large role in larger fiscal trends. During economic downturns, government revenues fall and expenditures rise as more people become eligible for mandatory programs such as Unemployment Insurance and Income Security programs. This causes deficits to increase or surpluses to shrink. Mandatory programs act as automatic stabilizers and provide a fiscal stimulus in the short run without the need for new legislative action. During the recession in 2008 and 2009, mandatory spending increased by 31% due to federal financial interventions and the economic downturn. Much of the money went to the Troubled Asset Relief Program and aid to Government Sponsored Enterprises such as Fannie Mae and Freddie Mac. Increased spending on Unemployment Insurance and the Supplemental Nutrition Assistance Program also contributed to the spike in spending. Prior to the recession, mandatory spending on Supplemental Security Income accounted for around 1.5 percent of GDP, but following the recession it accounted for around 3 percent of GDP. Many entitlement programs act as automatic stabilizers and as a result during economic downturns, the money needed to fund these programs increases significantly.

== Present ==
In FY 2016, mandatory spending accounted for 64 percent of all federal spending. Social Security, Medicare, and Medicaid were the largest individual mandatory expenditures, together accounting for about 78 percent of all mandatory spending. Social Security, Medicare, and Medicaid make up nearly 50 percent of all federal spending. Various income security programs, such as Supplemental Nutrition Assistance Program, Unemployment Insurance, earned income tax credit and child tax credit, account for an additional 18 percent of mandatory spending. Mandatory spending levels have and will continue to be affected by the automatic spending reduction process enacted as part of the Budget Control Act of 2011 (BCA). The BCA imposes small reductions to mandatory spending seeking to cut spending by less than $200 billion from FY2012 to FY2021. Mandatory spending was reduced by $18 billion in FY2015. Many programs are exempt from sequestration such as Social Security, Medicaid, Temporary Assistance for Needy Families, and the Supplemental Nutrition Assistance Program. The Bipartisan Budget Act of 2013 extended the mandatory spending sequester by two years through FY 2024. Increases in mandatory spending related to rising health care costs are projected to result in a continued upward trend despite these reductions. Some budget and social policy experts are worried that cuts in entitlement spending may compromise their goals: the economic security of the elderly and the poor.

== Future ==
According to the Congressional Budget Office (CBO), annual mandatory spending will increase from $2.4 trillion in 2016 to $4.3 trillion by 2027. Though averaging about 10 percent of GDP since 1973, mandatory spending is projected to increase to about 14 percent of GDP by 2027. Discretionary spending on the other hand is projected to fall further, to 5 percent of GDP. BY FY2022, discretionary spending's share of the economy is projected to be equal to or less than spending on Social Security and major health programs. Under the long term, projections suggest that if current policies remain unchanged, the US could face a major fiscal imbalance. Growth in spending, particularly for Social Security, Medicare, and Medicaid is projected to outstrip growth in revenues. This would result in larger deficits and higher debt. Mandatory spending on health care is projected to expand from 5 percent of GDP in FY2016 to 14 percent in FY2089. Social Security, is projected to expand from 5 percent of GDP in FY 2016 to 7 percent of GDP by FY2089. It is projected that if spending continues to increase, the deficit will reach 5.2 percent of GDP by 2027.

Mandatory spending under the BCA is projected to continue to grow in nominal terms and relative to GDP over the next 10 years. This growth is primarily due to elderly entitlement spending, such as Medicare and Social Security, that is projected to grow more quickly than GDP over the next ten years. The BCA has a minimal effect on this trend as it reduces mandatory spending under the automatic spending process by less than 0.1 percent of GDP annually. The cuts to Medicare are not projected to prevent Medicare from growing in terms or relative to GDP over the 10-year budget window. The share of mandatory spending will continue to increase as a portion of federal spending and GDP.

=== Entitlement programs ===
The number of beneficiaries of entitlement programs has grown as the average age of the population has risen. The Medicare Act of 1965 extended health benefits for most retirees and greatly expanded mandatory spending. As life expectancy has increased, the portion of the population over 85 has also increased, which has created a rise in Social Security and Medicare spending. CBO baseline projections show further increases in federal health care spending that will cause the total share of Medicare and Medicaid spending to rise. Federal spending on other health-related programs is also projected to increase as larger portions of the Affordable Care Act take effect. By FY2025, based on CBO baseline projections, spending on Medicare, Medicaid, and other major federal health care programs is projected to account for 31 percent of total federal spending. Other programs, such as Social Security Insurance and the earned income tax credit introduced in the 1970s, also increased the number of beneficiaries and thus mandatory spending.

== See also ==
- Bipartisan Budget Act of 2013
- Budget Control Act of 2011
- Budget process
