= Categorical grant =

Type of United States federal government funding to state and local projects

Categorical grants, also called conditional grants, are grants issued by the United States Congress which may be spent only for narrowly defined purposes. They are the main source of federal aid to state and local governments and can be used only for specified categories of state and local spending, such as education or roads. These grants have been accompanying rules and guidelines that constrain the recipient government in the use of grant funds. Categorical grants are intended to help states improve the overall well-being of their residents, but also empower the federal government to exert more power over the states within a specific policy area.

== Types of federal funding ==
The United States federal government gives financial assistance to states, local governments, and other entities. They are defined and governed by the Federal Grant and Cooperative Agreement Act of 1977, as incorporated in Title 31 Section 6304 of the U.S. Code. A Federal grant is a:

"...legal instrument reflecting the relationship between the United States Government and a State, a local government, or other entity when 1) the principal purpose of the relationship is to transfer a thing of value to the State or local government or other recipient to carry out a public purpose of support or stimulation authorized by a law of the United States instead of acquiring (by purchase, lease, or barter) property or services for the direct benefit or use of the United States Government; and 2) substantial involvement is not expected between the executive agency and the State, local government, or other recipient when carrying out the activity contemplated in the agreement.”

Federal grants are mainly categorized as block grants, categorical grants, and general revenue sharing. The U.S. federal government issues grants through more than 1,000 different grant programs across its agencies.

== Categorical grant distribution ==
The way categorical grants are distributed is either through project grants or formula grants.

=== Project grant funding ===
Project grant funding is given to help subsidize a specific service for a specified amount of time. These grants are competitive and follow a specific cycle. An agency makes a funding program based on their mission, Administration, and/or congressional initiatives. Then the grant making agency announces the funding opportunity and invites groups to apply. After the application is closed all applicants are reviewed by the agency and award recipients are chosen. States compete for project grant funding by going through the application process and those that best meet the application criteria are selected.

An example of project grant funding is the grants given by the Department of Agriculture Animal and Plant Health Inspection Services which operates the Wildlife Services Program. Applicants who meet the goal and the criteria might receive this funding for programs that help “Reduce damage caused by mammals and birds and those mammal and bird species that are reservoirs for zoonotic diseases, (except for urban rodent control through control and research activities)." as the grants objectives specify.

=== Formula grant funding ===
Formula grant funding is for services that help a particular group of people, such as low income students or children with disabilities. Unlike project grants, these do not involve a competitive process. All applicants who apply and meet the criteria receive funding based on a formula created by the federal government. Congress decides how much money to spend in an area and then they divvy it up to applicants (usually states) by their formula. This formula can be based on population or project goals.

For example, the United States Department of Health and Human Services operates the Nutrition Services Incentive Program. This program offers grant funding for states to give nutritious meals to the elderly in a geographic location. The formula used to determine how much grant money to give a state is based on how many meals were given out the year before within that state.

== Categorical grants ==
Head Start was created in 1965 as a summer school program to help low income students catch up before the start of their first year in school. Now they serve more than 1 million low income families per year in education health and encouraging parental involvement. Head Start programs are partially funded by categorical grants and in 2014 Congress gave over 500 million towards the program. Head Start categorical grant participants have to follow conditions of the grant meaning they have to make reports to the US Department of Health and Human Services periodically as well as submit to an annual audit.

Medicaid is also partially funded by categorical grants. Funds are given in the form of a formula grant to each state. Medicaid like Head Start is group specific in that it is meant to help low income persons and families.

== Cooperative federalism ==
Categorical grants increase the ability of the federal government to influence policy at the state and local levels. The United States Founding Fathers, particularly the Anti-Federalists, were skeptical of the power of the national government, and so the Constitution does not afford the federal government many tools to steer policy at the state and local levels. This means that when Congress has ideas about things they would like to implement on a national level, they have to have a way to get states to comply or agree. Categorical grants and other grants provide a way for the federal government to work cooperatively with the states and still get a broader national outcome. This outlines the basic idea of cooperative federalism where the states and the federal government work cooperatively and equally to achieve something bigger than either can do alone. Grants thereby incentivize states to help implement federal government national plans.

== Economic theory ==
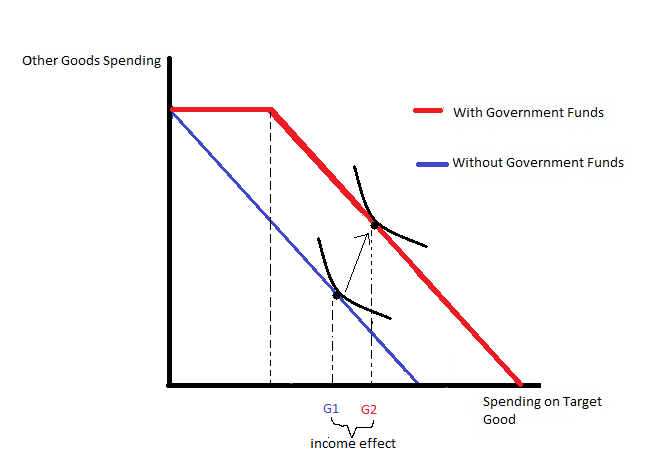
Possible Crowd Out of Categorical Grant

Economists have studied the idea of categorical grants through the systems they support, such as Medicaid, food stamps, and education programs. Specifically, they have looked at how these grants might cause the income and crowding out effects.

The crowding out effect is when the government's giving essentially lowers the amount of money the private sector would be able to provide themselves. This is always a concern with government grants. For example, if the government provides a categorical grant for education then some states might end up spending less on education than they would have without it because they are able to move to a better level of education without spending as much. This problem occurs when the amount of the grant is less than the state would have been willing to spend originally. They then use the grant to replace what they would have spent and therefore have more money to spend on other goods. Some economists believe in the Flypaper effect instead meaning that when more money is given to an area it tends to stick there like flypaper. This means that the state would essentially raise the budget for a good or service if they continued to get more money for it.
