= Gustavo A. Flores-Macías =

Political Scientist and Academic Administrator

Gustavo A. Flores-Macías is a Mexican political scientist and academic administrator whose research focuses on comparative politics, political economy, taxation, state capacity, public security, and economic reform in Latin America. He has served as dean of the University of Maryland School of Public Policy since September 2025. Before joining Maryland, he was a professor of government and public policy at Cornell University, where he also held several academic leadership positions.

Flores-Macías is the author of After Neoliberalism? The Left and Economic Reforms in Latin America and Contemporary State Building: Elite Taxation and Public Safety in Latin America, and the editor of The Political Economy of Taxation in Latin America. After Neoliberalism? received the Latin American Studies Association's Luciano Tomassini Book Award in 2014.

== Education ==
Flores-Macías earned a bachelor's degree in international relations from the Tecnológico de Monterrey in Mexico City. He later received a Master of Public Policy degree from Duke University, where he was a Fulbright scholar, and a doctorate in comparative government from Georgetown University.

== Academic career ==
Before entering academia, Flores-Macías served as director of public affairs at Mexico's Federal Consumer Protection Agency.

Flores-Macías joined the faculty of Cornell University in 2010. He became a professor in Cornell's Department of Government and the Cornell Jeb E. Brooks School of Public Policy. During his time at Cornell, he served in administrative positions including director of the Latin American Studies Program, associate vice provost for international affairs, and senior associate dean for strategic initiatives at the Brooks School.

In June 2025, the University of Maryland announced that Flores-Macías had been selected as dean of its School of Public Policy, succeeding Robert C. Orr. His appointment took effect on 1 September 2025.

== Research ==
Flores-Macías studies political and economic development in Latin America. His research has addressed the politics of economic reform, taxation, inequality, democracy, state capacity, crime, policing, and the militarization of public security.

His first book, After Neoliberalism? The Left and Economic Reforms in Latin America, examines why some left-of-center Latin American governments reversed market-oriented economic policies while others maintained them. The book emphasizes the role of political-party systems in shaping governments' ability to implement economic change. The book received the Latin American Studies Association's Luciano Tomassini Book Award in 2014.

Flores-Macías edited The Political Economy of Taxation in Latin America, published by Cambridge University Press in 2019. The volume examines how political institutions, public opinion, natural resources, interest groups, ideology, and state capacity affect taxation in Latin American countries. The book was reviewed in journals including Perspectives on Politics and Latin American Politics and Society.

In Contemporary State Building: Elite Taxation and Public Safety in Latin America, published by Cambridge University Press in 2022, Flores-Macías analyzes the conditions under which governments can persuade economic elites to accept increased taxation to finance public security. The study draws on cases from Colombia, Costa Rica, El Salvador, and Mexico. The book was reviewed in Latin American Politics and Society and other academic publications.

== Selected works ==
=== Books ===
- Flores-Macías, Gustavo A. (2012). After Neoliberalism? The Left and Economic Reforms in Latin America. New York: Oxford University Press. ISBN 978-0-19-989166-5.
- Flores-Macías, Gustavo A., ed. (2019). The Political Economy of Taxation in Latin America. Cambridge: Cambridge University Press. ISBN 978-1-108-47457-3.
- Flores-Macías, Gustavo A. (2022). Contemporary State Building: Elite Taxation and Public Safety in Latin America. Cambridge: Cambridge University Press. doi:10.1017/9781009095983. ISBN 978-1-316-51512-9.

== Awards and honors ==
- Luciano Tomassini Book Award, Latin American Studies Association, 2014, for After Neoliberalism? The Left and Economic Reforms in Latin America
