= Dennis Ippolito =

Dennis Stephan Ippolito (born 1942) is a professor of political science at Southern Methodist University and considered a leading historian and expert on governmental budget theory. He has written several books on the topic including Why Budgets Matter: Budget Policy and American Politics, published by Penn State Press and Congressional Spending: A Twentieth Century Fund Report, published by Cornell University Press.
