= Allen Schick =

Allen Schick is a governance fellow of the Brookings Institution and also a professor of political science at the Maryland School of Public Policy of University of Maryland, College Park. He is known as an authority on budget theory and the federal budget process, in particular. His book, Congress and Money: Budgeting, Spending, and Taxing, won the D.B. Hardeman Prize in 1982.

Schick advises members of Congress and has conducted numerous studies on budget systems and policies; public management; and government finance.

He is the founding editor of the professional journal, Public Budgeting and Finance.

== Publications ==
- Congress and Money: Spending, Taxing, and Budgeting, American Society for Public Administration, 1987
- Making Economic Policy in Congress, American Enterprise Institute, 1984
- The Capacity to Budget, 1990
- The Budget Puzzle, 1993
- The Federal Budget: Politics, Policy, Process, 1995
- Budget Innovation in the States, 1972
