= Performance-based budgeting =

Budgeting practice

Performance-based budgeting is the practice of developing budgets based on the relationship between program funding levels and expected results from that program. The performance-based budgeting process is a tool that program administrators use to manage budget outlays more cost-efficiently and effectively.

== Performance-based budgeting (PBB) ==
As explained by Carter (as quoted in), "Performance budgets use statements of missions, goals, and objectives to explain why the money is being spent. It is a way to allocate resources to achieve specific objectives based on program goals and measured results." The key to understanding performance-based budgeting lies beneath the word "result". In this method, the entire planning and budgeting framework is result oriented. There are objectives and activities to achieve these objectives and these form the foundation of the overall evaluation.

According to the more comprehensive definition of Segal and Summers, performance budgeting comprises three elements:

- the result (final outcome)
- the strategy (different ways to achieve the final outcome)
- activity/outputs (what is actually done to achieve the final outcome)

Segal and Summers point out that within this framework, a connection exists between the rationales for specific activities and the end results and the result is not excluded, while individual activities or outputs are. With this information, it is possible to understand which activities are cost-effective in terms of achieving the desired result.

As can be seen from some of the definitions used here, Performance-Based Budgeting is a way to allocate resources for achieving certain objectives,

Harrison elaborates: "PBB sets a goal, or a set of goals, to which monies are "connected" (i.e. allocated). From these goals, specific objectives are delineated and funds are then subdivided among them."

== Achieving PBB ==
Adopting the public sector's performance-based budgeting for the private sector using the Corporate Performance Management (CPM) framework. In performance-based budgeting, first the goals and objectives of the organization or department are identified, then measurement tools are developed and the last step is reporting.

== PBB in Higher Education ==
The application of Performance Based Budgeting in U.S. institutions of higher education provides incentives for colleges to enrol students and thus provide access to post-secondary education. Performance-based budgeting is an approach in which funding for an institution "depends on performing in certain ways and meeting certain expectations". "Historically, many colleges have received state funding based on how many full-time equivalent students are enrolled at the beginning of the semester". Thirty states have a funding formula in place that allocates some amount of funding based on performance indicators such as course completion, time to degree, transfer rates, the number of degrees awarded, or the number of low-income and minority graduates".

The strengths of PBB for Higher Education:

- Provides incentives for enrolling students and opening access to higher education;
- Focuses on results and accomplishments;
- A simple approach once expectations and measurements are defined;
- "Promotes equitable allocation of resources to those institutions that meet performance criteria."

The weaknesses of PBB for Higher Education:

- "Does not necessarily provide incentives for institutions to help students successfully complete degree programs?"
- Performance criteria and measures can be difficult to define;
- The time between accomplishments, accomplishment and its measurement and the allocation of funds might be great;
- Measuring long-term outcomes is difficult.
