= Budget process =

A budget process refers to the process by which governments create and approve a budget, which is as follows:

- The Financial Service Department prepares worksheets to assist the department head in preparation of department budget estimates
- The Administrator calls a meeting of managers and they present and discuss plans for the following year’s projected level of activity.
- The managers can work with the Financial Services, or work alone to prepare an estimate for the departments coming year.
- The completed budgets are presented by the managers to their Executive Officers for review and approval.
- Justification of the budget request may be required in writing. In most cases, the manager talks with their administrative officers about budget requirements. Adjustments to the budget submission may be required as a result of this phase in the process.

Budgeting is the setting of expenditure levels for each of an organization’s functions. It is the estimation and allocation of available capital used to achieve the designated targets of a firm.

== Terminology ==
- Revenue Estimation performed in the executive branch by the finance director, clerk's office, budget director, manager, or a team.
- Budget Call issued to outline the presentation form, recommend certain goals.
- Budget Formulation reflecting on the past, set goals for the future and reconcile the difference.
- Budget Hearings can include departments, sections, the executive, and the public to discuss changes in the budget.
- Budget Adoption final approval by the legislative body.
- Budget Execution amending the budget as the fiscal year progresses.

== Constitutional economics ==
Constitutional economics is the study of the compatibility of economic and financial decisions within existing constitutional law frameworks, and such a framework includes government spending on the judiciary which in many transitional and developing countries is completely controlled by the executive. It is useful to distinguish between the two methods of corruption of the judiciary: corruption by the executive branch, in contrast to corruption by private actors. The standards of constitutional economics can be used during annual budget process, and if that budget planning is transparent then the rule of law may benefit. The availability of an effective court system, to be used by the civil society in situations of unfair government spending and executive impoundment of previously authorized appropriations, is a key element for the success of the rule-of-law endeavor.

== See also ==
- Budget
- Economics
- Budget theory
- Political economy
- Constitutional economics
- public budgeting
- budget deficit
- budget surplus
- budget crisis
- Canadian federal budget
- Comprehensive income
- Government Accountability Office investigations of the Department of Defense
- Government-owned corporation
- public administration
- public finance
- United States budget process
