= Government Accountability Office investigations of the Department of Defense =

Type of U.S. government internal audit

Government Accountability Office investigations of the Department of Defense (DoD) are typically audits in which the Government Accountability Office (GAO), the United States Congress' investigative arm, studies how the Department of Defense spends taxpayer dollars. Since the GAO is accountable only to the legislative branch, it is in a unique position to investigate the military; no other agency can audit Federal departments with the same degree of independence from the President. However, the GAO is still subject to influence from powerful members of Congress. As of May 19, 2021, the DoD was the only government agency to have failed every audit since all government agencies were required to pass such audits by the Chief Financial Officers Act of 1990.

Two examples of major GAO investigations in the 2000s were the audits of Operation Iraqi Freedom and Defense Department airline reimbursements.

== Major investigations ==
=== Operation Iraqi Freedom ===
GAO investigations into Operation Iraqi Freedom revealed a number of accounting problems, ranging from the mundane to the severe. Pay irregularities were a chronic problem. In 2004 the GAO reported that 450 of the 481 Army National Guard soldiers from six Special Forces units had at least one pay problem associated with their mobilization impacting 94 percent of the soldiers. The report found that the DoD's inability to provide timely and accurate payments to these soldiers, many of whom served in Iraq or Afghanistan, distracted them from their missions, imposed financial hardships on the soldiers and their families, and may reduce retention.

Procurement irregularities included Halliburton charging the government $5 for hot meals they got from a Kuwaiti subcontractor, Timimmi, for $3 each. In one camp in July 2003 they "billed the government for an average 42,000 meals a day but served only 14,000. In a seven-month period, alleged overcharging in that camp totalled $16m."

As the investigation into Iraqi Freedom progressed, it began turning up worse and worse procurement problems. GAO auditors caught the department selling new chemical and biological protective garments on the Internet for $3 each. At the same time, the Pentagon was buying identical garments elsewhere for more than $200 apiece. Other accounting snafus resulted in the Army losing track of 56 airplanes, 32 tanks, and 36 Javelin missile command launch-units. In May 2003 SFGATE reported $1 trillion missing.

The GAO found that the waste encountered in Iraq is symptomatic of a wider inventory-control problem. More than 200 inventory-control systems at the Defense Department still are not integrated.

The GAO notes, "Poor communication between services within the Department of Defense and improper accounting results in the disposal of needed spare parts and the purchase of duplicative parts worth millions of dollars."

=== Airline reimbursements ===
A more recent GAO investigation revealed $100 million in wasted airline fees. The Associated Press notes that the Defense Department spent an estimated $100 million for airline tickets that were not used over six years and failed to seek refunds even though the tickets were reimbursable. The department also reimbursed employees for airline tickets that had been purchased by the department. To demonstrate how easy it was to have the Pentagon pay for airline travel, the investigators posed as Defense employees, had the department generate a ticket and showed up at the ticket counter to pick up a boarding pass.

The GAO also uncovered several incidences of airline-related fraud. One DoD traveler used a department account number to pay for more than 70 airline tickets totaling more than $60,000. He then sold them at a discount to coworkers and family members for personal travel. Another employee admitted to "accidentally" claiming reimbursement for $10,000 worth of airline tickets that had been paid for by the department.

== GAO influence over Defense Department reform ==
=== Defense Department responses to investigations ===
There is evidence that GAO investigations are encouraging the Department to reform. The Halliburton contract was re-negotiated and assigned directly to Timimmi. And Dov Zakheim, chief financial officer for the Pentagon, said, "We are overhauling our financial management system precisely because people like [GAO Comptroller General] David Walker are rightly critical of it".

These audits appear to have been more effective at prompting reform than the Defense Department's own initiatives. In 1989, the department began attempting to unify more than 2,000 overlapping systems used for billing, inventory, and personnel. But after spending $20 billion, the initiative was abandoned. Gregory Kutz, director of GAO's financial management division, noted the Pentagon's weak fiscal control over its subsidiaries – the Army, Navy, Air Force, and Marines – saying, "The [Pentagon's] inability to even complete an audit shows just how far they have to go."

=== Threats to GAO independence ===
Scholars believe, however, that the GAO's authority could be undermined in the wake of a landmark case, Walker vs. Cheney. This Federal lawsuit pertained to a GAO investigation into the Bush Administration's Energy Task Force. Vice President Dick Cheney refused to disclose which individuals and groups met with the Task Force, prompting Walker to sue for the information in Federal court. In December 2002, the court ruled for Cheney.

Congressional pressure persuaded Walker to abandon appeals. Having vowed to "go to the mat," he originally planned to pursue the case further. But the Center for Effective Government reported that, "Sen. Ted Stevens (R-AK), chairman of the Appropriations Committee, met with GAO Comptroller General David Walker earlier in [2003], and sources have reported that sharp cuts in the GAO $440 million budget were threatened if the lawsuit was pursued further.

The GAO was designed to be independent, and Walker cites several factors insulating his agency from political pressure. In a Roll Call op-ed, he remarks, "To begin with, our location in the legislative branch gives us some distance from the executive branches we audit and oversee. Moreover, the head of GAO serves a 15-year term, which gives the agency a continuity of leadership that is rare in the federal government. GAO's independence is further safeguarded by the fact that its workforce consists of career civil servants hired on the basis of their knowledge, skill, and ability."

However, the GAO, like all federal agencies, is subject to Congress' budgetary power. According to The Hill, "Walker did say . . . that several lawmakers have threatened in the past year to cut agency funding if it persisted with the controversial lawsuit. He also said the budget threat was among a number of factors that tipped his Feb. 7 decision to halt litigation."

It is difficult to tell whether curtailed GAO independence will threaten Defense Department reform. Some aspects of Defense Department accounting have resisted reform for decades. Danielle Brian, director of the nonprofit Project on Government Oversight, says, "Waste has become ingrained in the Defense budget because opposition to defense spending is portrayed as unpatriotic, and legislators are often more concerned about winning Pentagon pork than controlling defense waste."

But even Representatives who generally support Defense spending seem to be getting fed up with the problem. Representative Thomas M. Davis, R-Virginia, asked the Pentagon to present 11 documents relating to contracts in Iraq, among them papers that would prove whether Halliburton benefited from its association with Cheney. And Rep. John Duncan, R-Tenn., of the House Committee on Government Reform recently said, "I've always considered myself to be a pro-military type person, but that doesn't mean I just want to sit back and watch the Pentagon waste billions and billions of dollars."

Supporters of the GAO investigations like to point out the disparity between the GAO budget and military expenses. The GAO's Fiscal Year 2016 annual budget was $555 million, with "Measurable financial benefits from GAO work: $63.4 billion--a return of about $112 on every dollar invested in GAO." In contrast, GAO reports show that the Defense Department's 2,200 overlapping financial systems cost $18 billion a year to operate.

In March 2016, the Project on Government Oversight reported that, "The Department of Defense remains the only federal agency that can't get a clean audit". DoD sources said, "I think we are on the right track [but] it will take a couple more years." However, "unless efforts to hold the Pentagon accountable become law, it's unlikely that the largest government agency will be able to be audited any time soon.
