= Program Assessment Rating Tool =

The Program Assessment Rating Tool, or PART, was a program run through the United States Office of Management and Budget to rate the effectiveness of all federal programs, PART was instituted by President George W. Bush in 2002. It was discontinued by the Obama administration.

PART was spearheaded by OMB Director Mitch Daniels. OMB staff designed PART and set the final evaluation assigned to a program.

By the end of the Bush administration, PART had been applied to over 1,000 federal programs, representing 98% of the federal budget.

== History ==
PART was introduced in the 2004 Fiscal Year Federal budget. The Bush administration claimed that PART built upon previous efforts of American presidents to make sure federal programs were accountable and achieved results. PART grew out of an early Bush administration blueprint for administration called the President's Management Agenda, which set a goal of integrating performance data with the federal budgeting process.

== Implementation ==
PART was a survey instrument, developed by OMB staff with outside advice. The instrument asked 25-30 questions divided into four categories:

- program purpose and design
- strategic planning
- program management
- program results

Based on the responses, programs were given a numerical score that aligned with a categorical scale of performance ranging from effective, moderately effective, adequate or ineffective.

In cases where evaluators felt they could not make a judgment, programs were assigned a "results not demonstrated" judgment, which was generally believed to be a negative assessment on a par with an ineffective grade. To complete the tool, OMB budget examiners conducted extensive consultation with agency staff, though the final judgment rested with the OMB.

== Utilization ==
Bush used the rating tool to partially justify cuts or elimination of 150 programs in his 2006 FY budget. One study found that PART scores had a modest correlation with budget changes proposed by Bush.

Result	2002	2003	2004	2005	2006	2007	2008
Effective	6%	11%	15%	15%	17%		19%
Moderately Effective	24%	26%	26%	29%	30%		32%
Adequate	15%	20%	26%	28%	28%		29%
Ineffective	5%	5%	4%	4%	3%		3%
Results Not Demonstrated	50%	38%	29%	24%	22%		17%
Total Programs Reviewed	234	407	607	793	977		1017

== Reception ==
Reaction from the United States Congress was mixed. However, Congress paid little attention to the PART scores. Scholars at the Heritage Foundation support the program and its potential to reduce the size of government. The program won the 2005 Government Innovators Network Award, noting that the program's reception has led to similar program evaluation systems in Scotland, Thailand, and South Korea.

Efforts to institutionalize the PART into a permanent process failed in Congress, and PART was viewed with suspicion by Democratic lawmakers in particular.
