= Executive budget =

Seal of the Office of Management and Budget of the US Government

The executive budget is the budget for the executive branch of the United States government. It was established as one of the reforms during the Progressive Era and became a federal policy in 1921 under the Woodrow Wilson Administration. The process of creating the executive budget consists of three phases. The first stage is the development of the president's budget. In this stage, the president submits a comprehensive budget to the United States Congress that covers the full range of federal activities. Next, the budget proposal is edited and revised by Congress. Last, the budget is finalized and executed. It is then given a budget bill from the legislature. The legislature composes the budget bill while an executive agency implements the bill by choosing which projects to take on within the limitations imposed.

== History ==
One of the reforms of the Progressive Era in the United States was the executive budget system which had its first application for municipal government. The federal government conducted an important study of the executive budget system during the administration of President William Howard Taft (See Sec. VI: The Taft Commission's Federal Budget Study, pp. 26–31).

The executive budget system was adapted from the longstanding British parliamentary practice that forbade the House of Commons to increase requests for supply (appropriations) from the governing ministry (prime minister and cabinet) without the approval of the responsible government minister (cabinet member.)(See Sec. VI: Taft)

It became federal policy in 1921 based on actions of the Wilson Administration that were enacted during the administration of Warren G. Harding.

== Process ==
The executive budget process consists of three main phases: development of the president's budget, interaction with congress, and execution of the budget.

=== Development of the president's budget ===
The legal framework established by the Budget and Accounting Act of 1921 requires the president to annually submit a comprehensive budget to Congress that covers the full range of federal activities. Current law requires the president to submit his budget proposal no later than the first Monday in February. The creation of the budget usually begins approximately 10 months before the president submits his budget to congress (about 18 months before the start of the fiscal year). During the early stages of the budget's formulation, federal agencies prepare their budget requests following their own procedures.

=== Interaction with congress ===
The president's budget does not have any legally binding effect, but rather initiates the congressional budget process and provides a statement of the budgetary goals of the president. After the president submits his budget proposal, Office of Management and Budget and other administration officials testify before the congressional committees. Individual federal agencies also justify and explain their specific budget requests at congressional hearings as budgetary legislation is formulated. Agencies submit extensive written justifications, usually focusing on the proposed increase or decrease in spending, to the responsible appropriations subcommittees of each chamber. The Office of Management and Budget ensures that agency budget justifications, testimony, and other submissions are consistent with the president's policies by requiring agencies to clear any material through The Office of Management and Budget before providing it to Congress. The president is required to submit a mid-session review by July 15 of each year. This budget update must reflect changes in economic conditions, any legislative actions taken by Congress, and other factors affecting the president's initial budget submission.

=== Execution of the budget ===
Once appropriation acts and any other budgetary legislation, such as revenue or reconciliation measures, become law, they are executed by the appropriate federal agencies. However, funds provided in statutes are not automatically available to agencies for obligation. Appropriated funds first must be apportioned by fiscal quarter or by activity as appropriate. The Office of Management and Budget is responsible for reviewing apportionment requests and making funds available to agencies.

== Projects ==
The legislature proposes a budget bill for the executive agency that includes a cap on total spending and earmarked allocations to designated public projects. Each of these projects offers benefits to an interest group. In deciding which project to fund, the executive agency is able to observe the productivity of each of the projects before their decision. Earmarks occur when the executive serves a wide variety of interests, and a cap on spending occurs when the executive's constituency is not as broad as that of the powerful legislators. There is a separation of power between the legislative and executive branches of the government. The legislature composes the budget bill, which may or may not include a cap on total spending and earmarked allocations to designated projects, while an executive agency implements the bill by choosing which projects to take on within the limitations imposed by the law.

== See also ==
- United States federal budget
- United States Congress
