= Formula grant =

Type of U.S. federal funding grant

A formula grant is a United States federal grant where funding is allocated to grantees using a precise formula in the legislation creating the program. Formulas include quantifiable elements, such as population, amount of tax effort, proportion of population unemployed or below poverty level, density of housing, or rate of infant mortality.

The specified formula is a rule that tells potential recipient governments precisely how they can calculate the quantity of aid to which they are entitled under the provisions of law, as long as the recipient qualifies for such assistance under the stipulations of the program. Usually, the elements in the formula are chosen to reflect characteristics related to the purpose of the aid. Some factors in the formula are also likely to have political significance since there is no such thing as a neutral formula, as all formulas reward some states or localities more than others, depending on their relative standing given the formula specified.
